= Tillandsia ventanaensis =

Scientific classification
- Kingdom: Plantae
- Clade: Tracheophytes
- Clade: Angiosperms
- Clade: Monocots
- Clade: Commelinids
- Order: Poales
- Family: Bromeliaceae
- Genus: Tillandsia
- Subgenus: Tillandsia subg. Tillandsia
- Species: T. ventanaensis

Binomial name
- Tillandsia ventanaensis Ehlers & Koide

Species of plant

Tillandsia ventanaensis is an epiphytic species in the genus Tillandsia first described in 1995. This species is endemic only to the state of Durango, Mexico between elevations of 1,800–2,000 meters, in the vicinity of the border of Sinaloa in the Sierra de las Ventanas. This plant is stemless, flowering erect 35–55 cm high, with rigid leaves up to 55 cm long.
