= Tillandsia baliophylla =

Scientific classification
- Kingdom: Plantae
- Clade: Tracheophytes
- Clade: Angiosperms
- Clade: Monocots
- Clade: Commelinids
- Order: Poales
- Family: Bromeliaceae
- Genus: Tillandsia
- Subgenus: Tillandsia subg. Tillandsia
- Species: T. baliophylla

Binomial name
- Tillandsia baliophylla Harms

Species of plant

Tillandsia baliophylla is a species in the genus Tillandsia. It is endemic to the Island of Hispaniola in the West Indies.

== Cultivars ==
- × Vrieslandsia 'Fire Magic'
