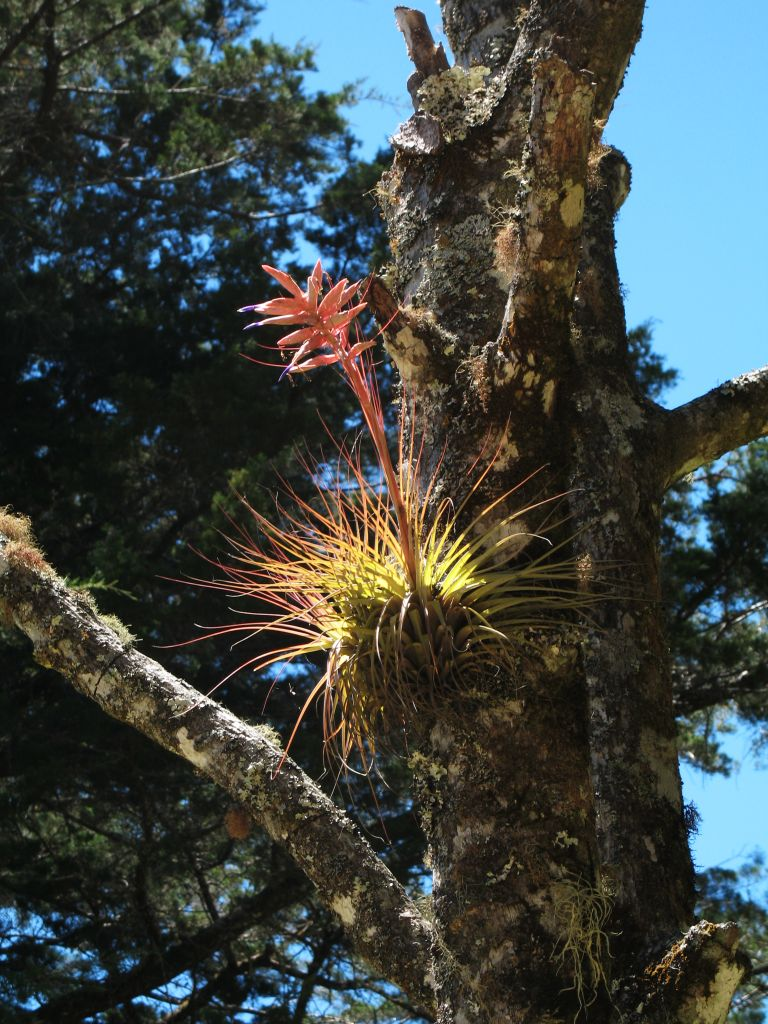

Scientific classification
- Kingdom: Plantae
- Clade: Tracheophytes
- Clade: Angiosperms
- Clade: Monocots
- Clade: Commelinids
- Order: Poales
- Family: Bromeliaceae
- Genus: Tillandsia
- Subgenus: Tillandsia subg. Tillandsia
- Species: T. vicentina

Binomial name
- Tillandsia vicentina Standley

Synonyms
- Tillandsia vicentina var. wuelfinghoffii E.Gross

= Tillandsia vicentina =

Species of epiphyte

Tillandsia vicentina is a species of flowering plant in the genus Tillandsia. This species is native to Oaxaca, Chiapas, Guatemala, El Salvador, Honduras, and Nicaragua.
