= Tillandsia moscosoi =

Scientific classification
- Kingdom: Plantae
- Clade: Tracheophytes
- Clade: Angiosperms
- Clade: Monocots
- Clade: Commelinids
- Order: Poales
- Family: Bromeliaceae
- Genus: Tillandsia
- Subgenus: Tillandsia subg. Tillandsia
- Species: T. moscosoi

Binomial name
- Tillandsia moscosoi L.B.Sm. & Jiménez

Species of plant

Tillandsia moscosoi is an epiphyte in the genus Tillandsia. It is endemic to the Dominican Republic. It has pale lavender flowers.

== Cultivars ==
- Tillandsia 'Summer Dawn'
