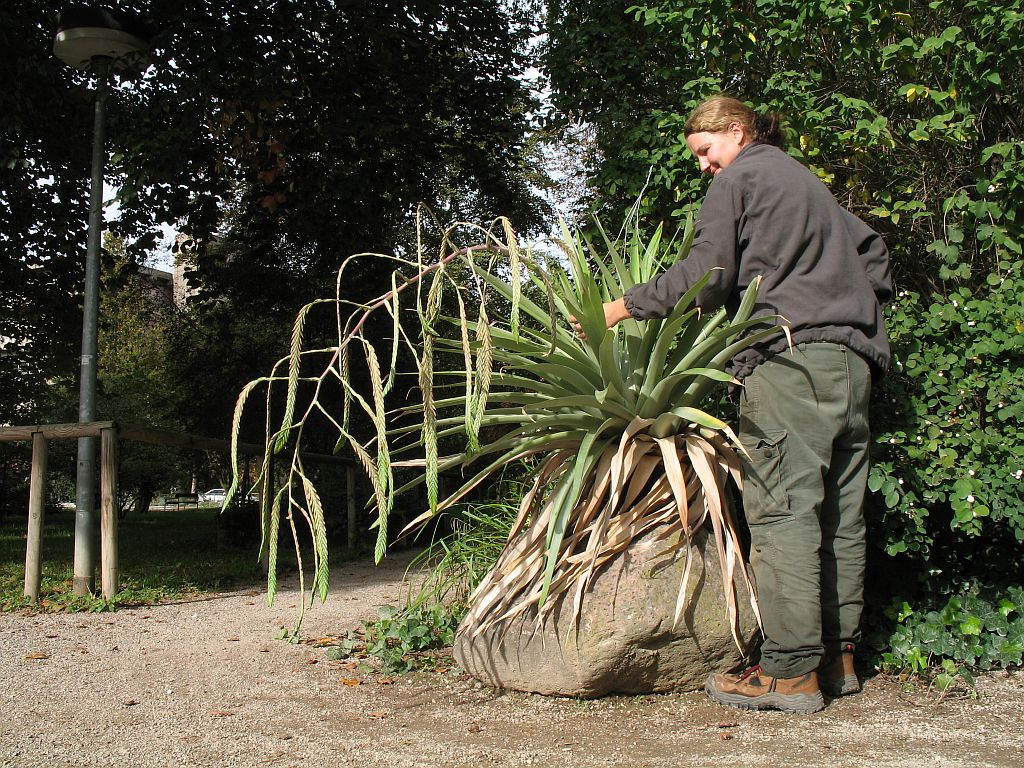

Scientific classification
- Kingdom: Plantae
- Clade: Embryophytes
- Clade: Tracheophytes
- Clade: Angiosperms
- Clade: Monocots
- Clade: Commelinids
- Order: Poales
- Family: Bromeliaceae
- Genus: Tillandsia
- Subgenus: Tillandsia subg. Tillandsia
- Species: T. ferreyrae

Binomial name
- Tillandsia ferreyrae L.B.Sm.

= Tillandsia ferreyrae =

Species of plant

Tillandsia ferreyrae is a species of flowering plant in the genus Tillandsia, endemic to Peru.

== Cultivars ==
- Tillandsia 'Rechoncho'
- Tillandsia 'Royal Sceptre'
