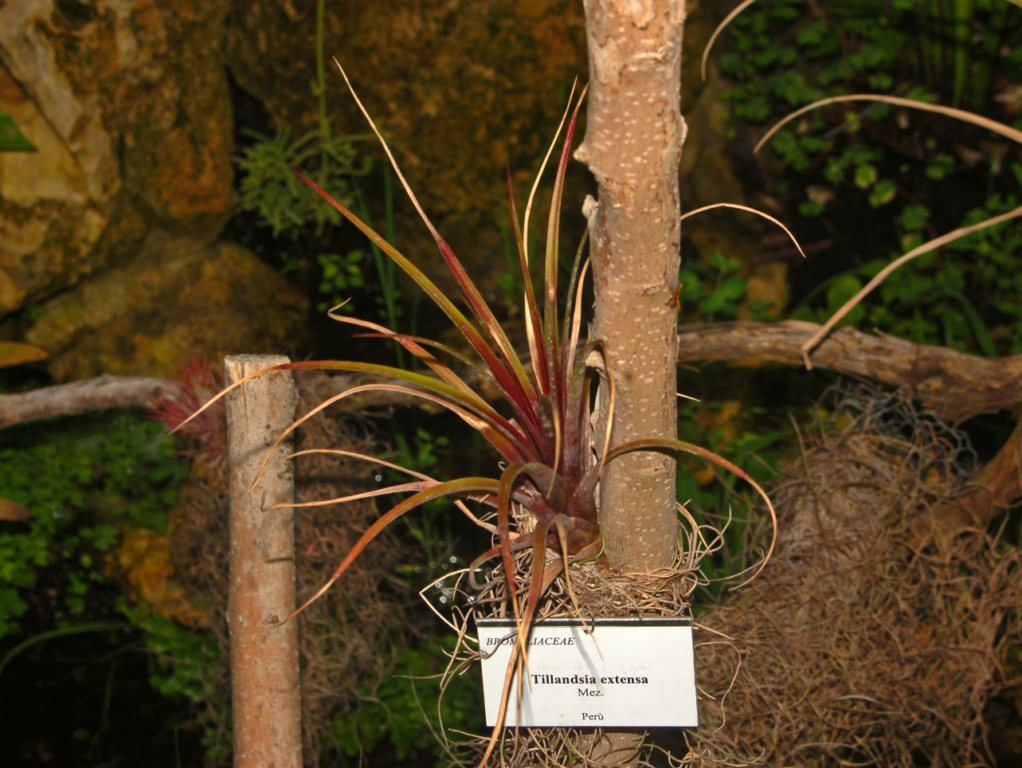
- Tillandsia extensa at the botanical garden of Villa Durazzo-Pallavicini, Genova Pegli

Scientific classification
- Kingdom: Plantae
- Clade: Tracheophytes
- Clade: Angiosperms
- Clade: Monocots
- Clade: Commelinids
- Order: Poales
- Family: Bromeliaceae
- Genus: Tillandsia
- Subgenus: Tillandsia subg. Tillandsia
- Species: T. extensa

Binomial name
- Tillandsia extensa Mez

= Tillandsia extensa =

Species of plant

Tillandsia extensa is a species of flowering plant in the genus Tillandsia. It is endemic to Peru.

== Habitat ==
Tillandsia extensa can be found on cliffs at an elevation of about 500–2,500 metres (1,600–8,200 ft) above sea level.
