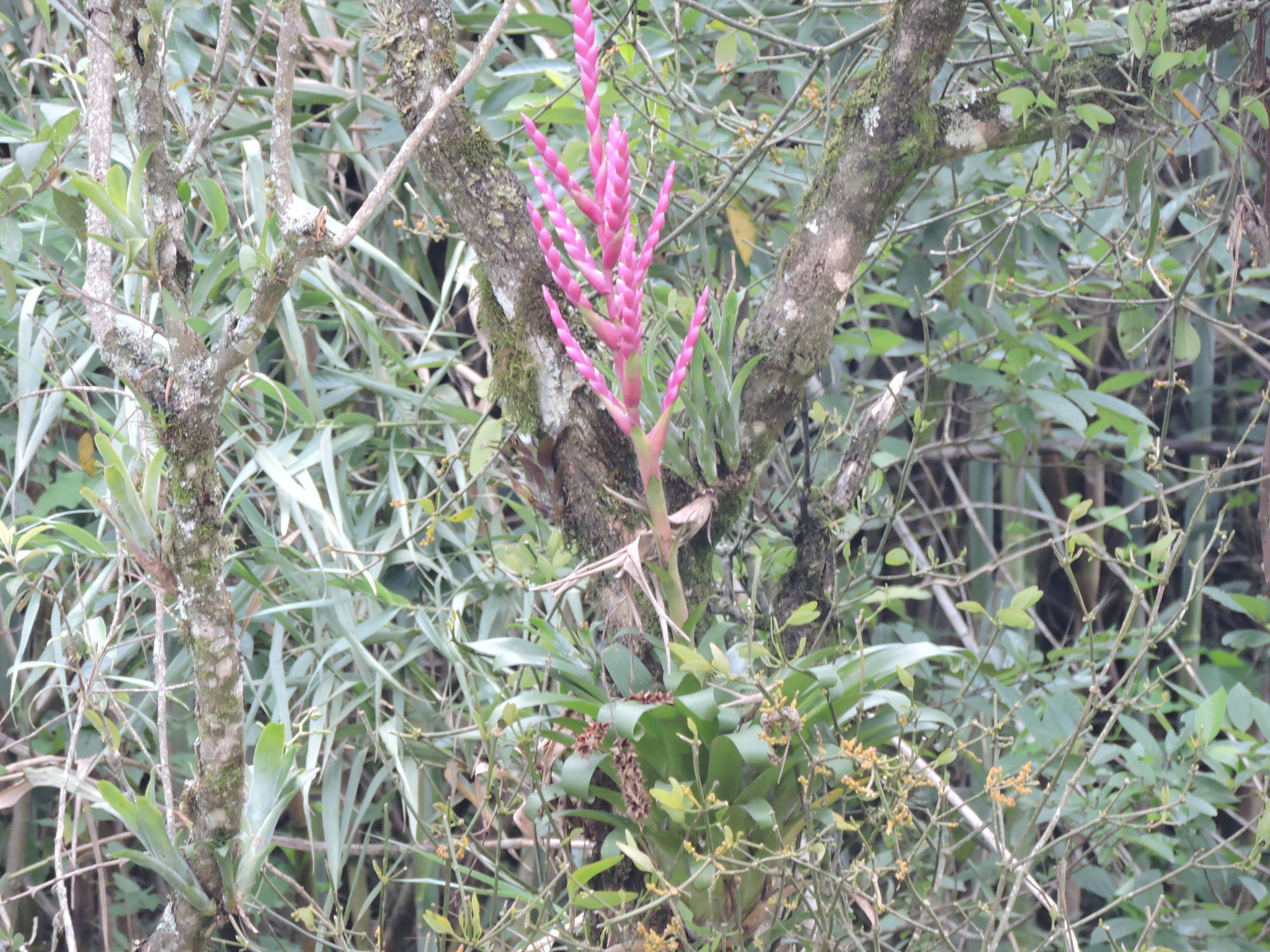

Scientific classification
- Kingdom: Plantae
- Clade: Tracheophytes
- Clade: Angiosperms
- Clade: Monocots
- Clade: Commelinids
- Order: Poales
- Family: Bromeliaceae
- Genus: Tillandsia
- Subgenus: Tillandsia subg. Tillandsia
- Species: T. lucida

Binomial name
- Tillandsia lucida E. Morren ex Baker

= Tillandsia lucida =

Species of flowering plant

Tillandsia lucida is a species of flowering plant in the genus Tillandsia. This species is native to Mexico, Guatemala, Nicaragua, and Honduras.

== Cultivars ==
- Tillandsia 'Discovery'
