= Tillandsia wuelfinghoffii =

Scientific classification
- Kingdom: Plantae
- Clade: Tracheophytes
- Clade: Angiosperms
- Clade: Monocots
- Clade: Commelinids
- Order: Poales
- Family: Bromeliaceae
- Genus: Tillandsia
- Subgenus: Tillandsia subg. Tillandsia
- Species: T. wuelfinghoffii

Binomial name
- Tillandsia wuelfinghoffii Ehlers

Species of plant

Tillandsia wuelfinghoffii is a species of flowering plant in the genus Tillandsia. This species is endemic to Mexico.
