= Tillandsia orogenes =

Scientific classification
- Kingdom: Plantae
- Clade: Tracheophytes
- Clade: Angiosperms
- Clade: Monocots
- Clade: Commelinids
- Order: Poales
- Family: Bromeliaceae
- Genus: Tillandsia
- Subgenus: Tillandsia subg. Tillandsia
- Species: T. orogenes

Binomial name
- Tillandsia orogenes Standley & L.O.Williams

Species of plant

Tillandsia orogenes is a species of flowering plant in the genus Tillandsia. This species is native to Chiapas, Guatemala, Nicaragua and Honduras.
