= Tillandsia mooreana =

Scientific classification
- Kingdom: Plantae
- Clade: Tracheophytes
- Clade: Angiosperms
- Clade: Monocots
- Clade: Commelinids
- Order: Poales
- Family: Bromeliaceae
- Genus: Tillandsia
- Subgenus: Tillandsia subg. Tillandsia
- Species: T. mooreana

Binomial name
- Tillandsia mooreana L.B.Sm.

Species of plant

Tillandsia mooreana is a species of flowering plant in the genus Tillandsia. This species is endemic to Mexico. Its foliage is evergreen, forming either strap-shaped or linear leaves.

== Cultivars ==
- × Vrieslandsia 'Harmony'
- × Vrieslandsia 'Harmony Too'
- Tillandsia ‘Samantha’
