= Tillandsia copalaensis =

Scientific classification
- Kingdom: Plantae
- Clade: Tracheophytes
- Clade: Angiosperms
- Clade: Monocots
- Clade: Commelinids
- Order: Poales
- Family: Bromeliaceae
- Genus: Tillandsia
- Subgenus: Tillandsia subg. Tillandsia
- Species: T. copalaensis

Binomial name
- Tillandsia copalaensis Ehlers

Synonyms

Species of plant

Tillandsia copalaensis is a species in the genus Tillandsia, endemic to Mexico.
