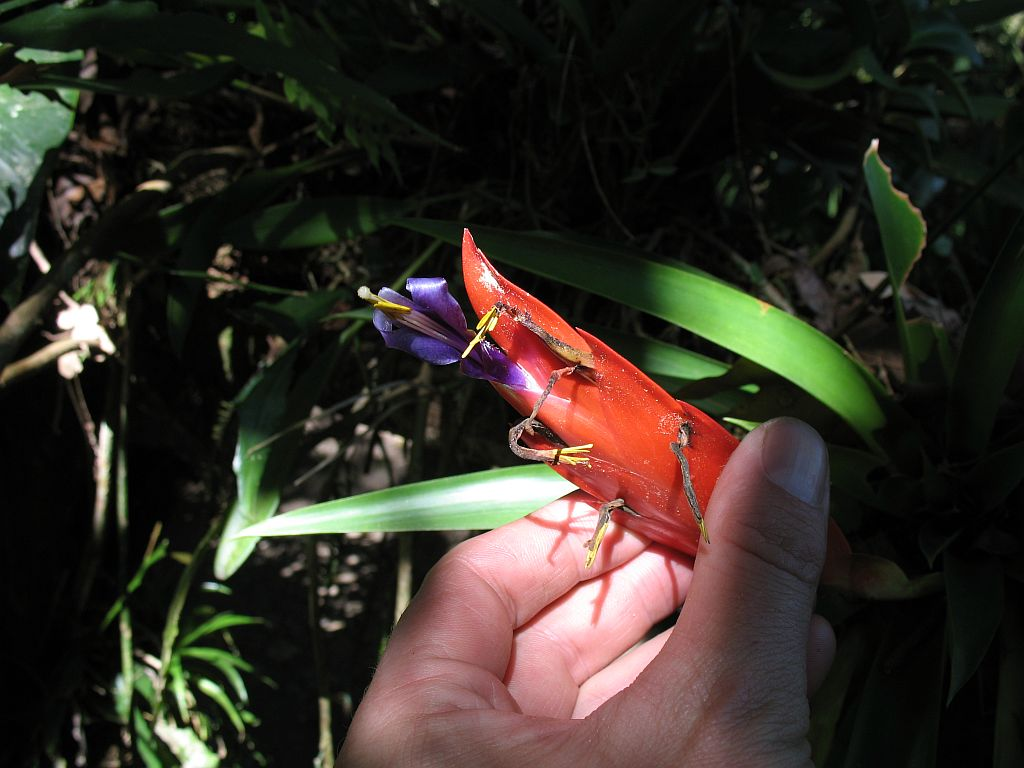

Scientific classification
- Kingdom: Plantae
- Clade: Tracheophytes
- Clade: Angiosperms
- Clade: Monocots
- Clade: Commelinids
- Order: Poales
- Family: Bromeliaceae
- Genus: Tillandsia
- Subgenus: Tillandsia subg. Tillandsia
- Species: T. multicaulis

Binomial name
- Tillandsia multicaulis Steud.

Synonyms
- Tillandsia schlechtendalii Baker; Vriesea schlechtendalii (Baker) Wittm; Vriesea caespitosa E.Morren ex Baker

= Tillandsia multicaulis =

Species of plant

Tillandsia multicaulis is a species of flowering plant in the genus Tillandsia. This species is native to Central America and Mexico (from Chiapas north to Hidalgo).

== Cultivars ==
- Tillandsia 'Wildfire'
- × Vrieslandsia 'Blazing Tropics'
- × Vrieslandsia 'Golden Touch'
- × Vrieslandsia 'Spiraling Flame'
- × Vrieslandsia 'Swamp Fire'
