= Tillandsia marabascoensis =

Scientific classification
- Kingdom: Plantae
- Clade: Tracheophytes
- Clade: Angiosperms
- Clade: Monocots
- Clade: Commelinids
- Order: Poales
- Family: Bromeliaceae
- Genus: Tillandsia
- Subgenus: Tillandsia subg. Tillandsia
- Species: T. marabascoensis

Binomial name
- Tillandsia marabascoensis Ehlers & Lautner

Species of plant

Tillandsia marabascoensis is a species of flowering plant in the family Bromeliaceae, native to southwestern Mexico. It was first described in 1992.
