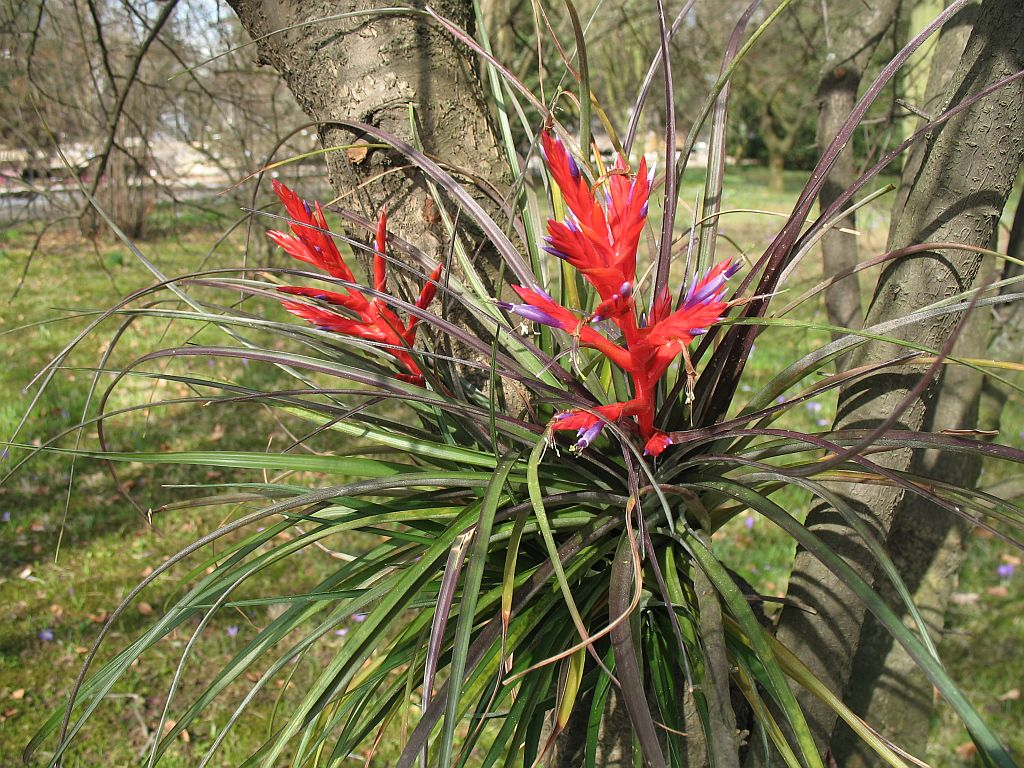

Scientific classification
- Kingdom: Plantae
- Clade: Tracheophytes
- Clade: Angiosperms
- Clade: Monocots
- Clade: Commelinids
- Order: Poales
- Family: Bromeliaceae
- Genus: Tillandsia
- Subgenus: Tillandsia subg. Tillandsia
- Species: T. chlorophylla

Binomial name
- Tillandsia chlorophylla L.B.Sm.

Synonyms
- Tillandsia santiago-tuxtlensis Matuda

= Tillandsia chlorophylla =

Species of plant

Tillandsia chlorophylla is a species of flowering plant in the genus Tillandsia. This species is native to Belize, Guatemala, and southern Mexico (Veracruz, Oaxaca, Chiapas).

== Cultivars ==
- Tillandsia 'Lit'l Lucy'
