= Tillandsia rhodocephala =

Scientific classification
- Kingdom: Plantae
- Clade: Tracheophytes
- Clade: Angiosperms
- Clade: Monocots
- Clade: Commelinids
- Order: Poales
- Family: Bromeliaceae
- Genus: Tillandsia
- Subgenus: Tillandsia subg. Tillandsia
- Species: T. rhodocephala

Binomial name
- Tillandsia rhodocephala Ehlers & Koide

Species of plant

Tillandsia rhodocephala is a species of flowering plant in the genus Tillandsia. This species is endemic to Mexico. Rhodocephala have long thin leaves which curl inwards and sprout from a thick central stem.
