= Tillandsia deppeana =

Scientific classification
- Kingdom: Plantae
- Clade: Tracheophytes
- Clade: Angiosperms
- Clade: Monocots
- Clade: Commelinids
- Order: Poales
- Family: Bromeliaceae
- Genus: Tillandsia
- Subgenus: Tillandsia subg. Tillandsia
- Species: T. deppeana

Binomial name
- Tillandsia deppeana Steud.

Species of plant

Tillandsia deppeana is a species of flowering plant in the genus Tillandsia. This species is endemic to Mexico.

== Cultivars ==
- Tillandsia 'Mayan Torch'
- Tillandsia 'Sentry'
- Tillandsia 'Wildfire'
- × Vrieslandsia 'Inca Chief'
- × Vrieslandsia 'Mayan Chief'
- × Vrieslandsia 'Nedra'
- × Vrieslandsia 'Stargazer'
