= Tillandsia botterii =

Scientific classification
- Kingdom: Plantae
- Clade: Tracheophytes
- Clade: Angiosperms
- Clade: Monocots
- Clade: Commelinids
- Order: Poales
- Family: Bromeliaceae
- Genus: Tillandsia
- Subgenus: Tillandsia subg. Tillandsia
- Species: T. botterii

Binomial name
- Tillandsia botterii É.Morren ex Baker

Species of plant

Tillandsia botterii is a species in the genus Tillandsia. It is endemic to Mexico.
