= Tillandsia diguetii =

Scientific classification
- Kingdom: Plantae
- Clade: Embryophytes
- Clade: Tracheophytes
- Clade: Spermatophytes
- Clade: Angiosperms
- Clade: Monocots
- Clade: Commelinids
- Order: Poales
- Family: Bromeliaceae
- Genus: Tillandsia
- Subgenus: Tillandsia subg. Tillandsia
- Species: T. diguetii

Binomial name
- Tillandsia diguetii Mez & Rol.-Goss.

Species of plant

Tillandsia diguetii is a species of flowering plant in the family Bromeliaceae. This species is endemic to Mexico.

== Taxonomy ==
=== Cultivars ===
Recognized cultivars include:

- Tillandsia 'Squatty Body'
