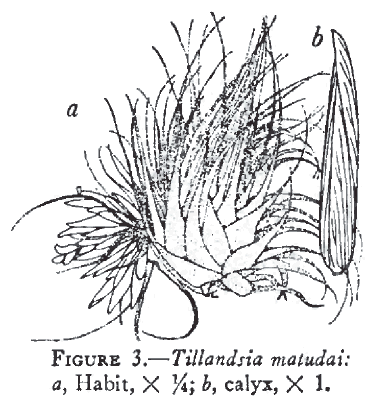

Scientific classification
- Kingdom: Plantae
- Clade: Tracheophytes
- Clade: Angiosperms
- Clade: Monocots
- Clade: Commelinids
- Order: Poales
- Family: Bromeliaceae
- Genus: Tillandsia
- Subgenus: Tillandsia subg. Tillandsia
- Species: T. matudae

Binomial name
- Tillandsia matudae L.B.Sm.

Synonyms
- Tillandsia velickiana L.B.Sm.; Tillandsia feldhoffii Ehlers

= Tillandsia matudae =

Species of plant

Tillandsia matudae is a species of flowering plant in the genus Tillandsia. This species is native to Oaxaca, Chiapas and Guatemala.
