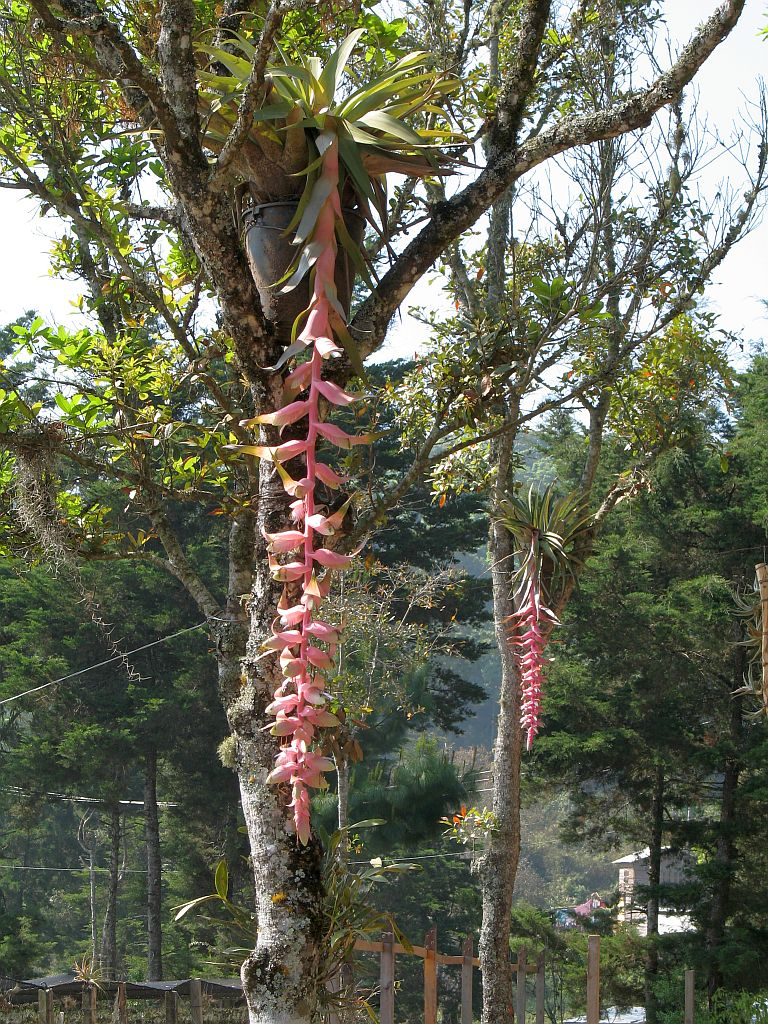
- Tillandsia eizii in cultivation in a nursery near Guatemala City, Guatemala; 1965 m.

Scientific classification
- Kingdom: Plantae
- Clade: Tracheophytes
- Clade: Angiosperms
- Clade: Monocots
- Clade: Commelinids
- Order: Poales
- Family: Bromeliaceae
- Genus: Tillandsia
- Subgenus: Tillandsia subg. Tillandsia
- Species: T. eizii

Binomial name
- Tillandsia eizii L.B.Sm.

= Tillandsia eizii =

Species of plant

Tillandsia eizii is a species of flowering plant in the family Bromeliaceae. This species is native to Mexico.

Some of the physiological characteristics of Tillandsia eizii considered to be problematic include having low seed viability and germination.
