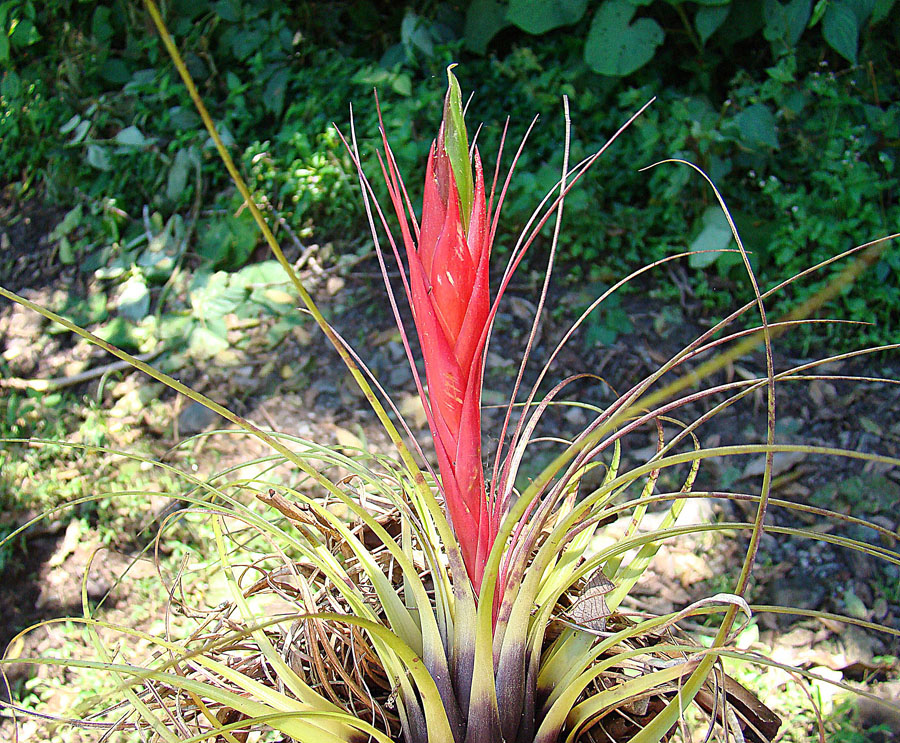

Scientific classification
- Kingdom: Plantae
- Clade: Tracheophytes
- Clade: Angiosperms
- Clade: Monocots
- Clade: Commelinids
- Order: Poales
- Family: Bromeliaceae
- Genus: Tillandsia
- Subgenus: Tillandsia subg. Tillandsia
- Species: T. punctulata

Binomial name
- Tillandsia punctulata Schltdl. & Cham.

Synonyms
- Tillandsia melanopus E.Morren ex Mez

= Tillandsia punctulata =

Species of plant

Tillandsia punctulata is a species of flowering plant in the genus Tillandsia. This species is native to Central America (all 7 countries) and Mexico.

== Cultivars ==
- Tillandsia 'Tina'
