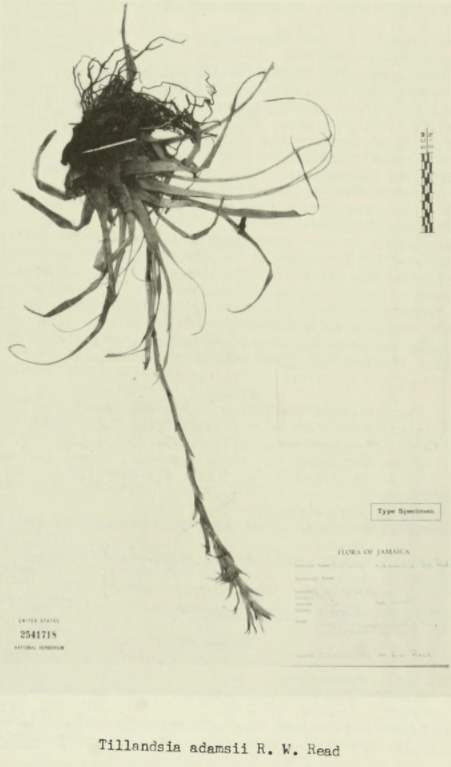

Scientific classification
- Kingdom: Plantae
- Clade: Tracheophytes
- Clade: Angiosperms
- Clade: Monocots
- Clade: Commelinids
- Order: Poales
- Family: Bromeliaceae
- Genus: Tillandsia
- Subgenus: Tillandsia subg. Tillandsia
- Species: T. adamsii

Binomial name
- Tillandsia adamsii R.W.Read

= Tillandsia adamsii =

Species of epiphyte

Tillandsia adamsii is a species in the genus Tillandsia. This species is native to Jamaica.

== Name ==
The species is named after English botanist Charles Dennis Adams who authored Flowering Plants of Jamaica and Caribbean Flora.
