= Tillandsia ferrisiana =

Scientific classification
- Kingdom: Plantae
- Clade: Tracheophytes
- Clade: Angiosperms
- Clade: Monocots
- Clade: Commelinids
- Order: Poales
- Family: Bromeliaceae
- Genus: Tillandsia
- Subgenus: Tillandsia subg. Tillandsia
- Species: T. ferrisiana

Binomial name
- Tillandsia ferrisiana L.B.Sm.

Species of plant

Tillandsia ferrisiana is a species of flowering plant in the bromeliad family commonly known as the Ferris tillandsia. This species is endemic to the states of Baja California Sur, Nayarit, and Sinaloa in Mexico.
