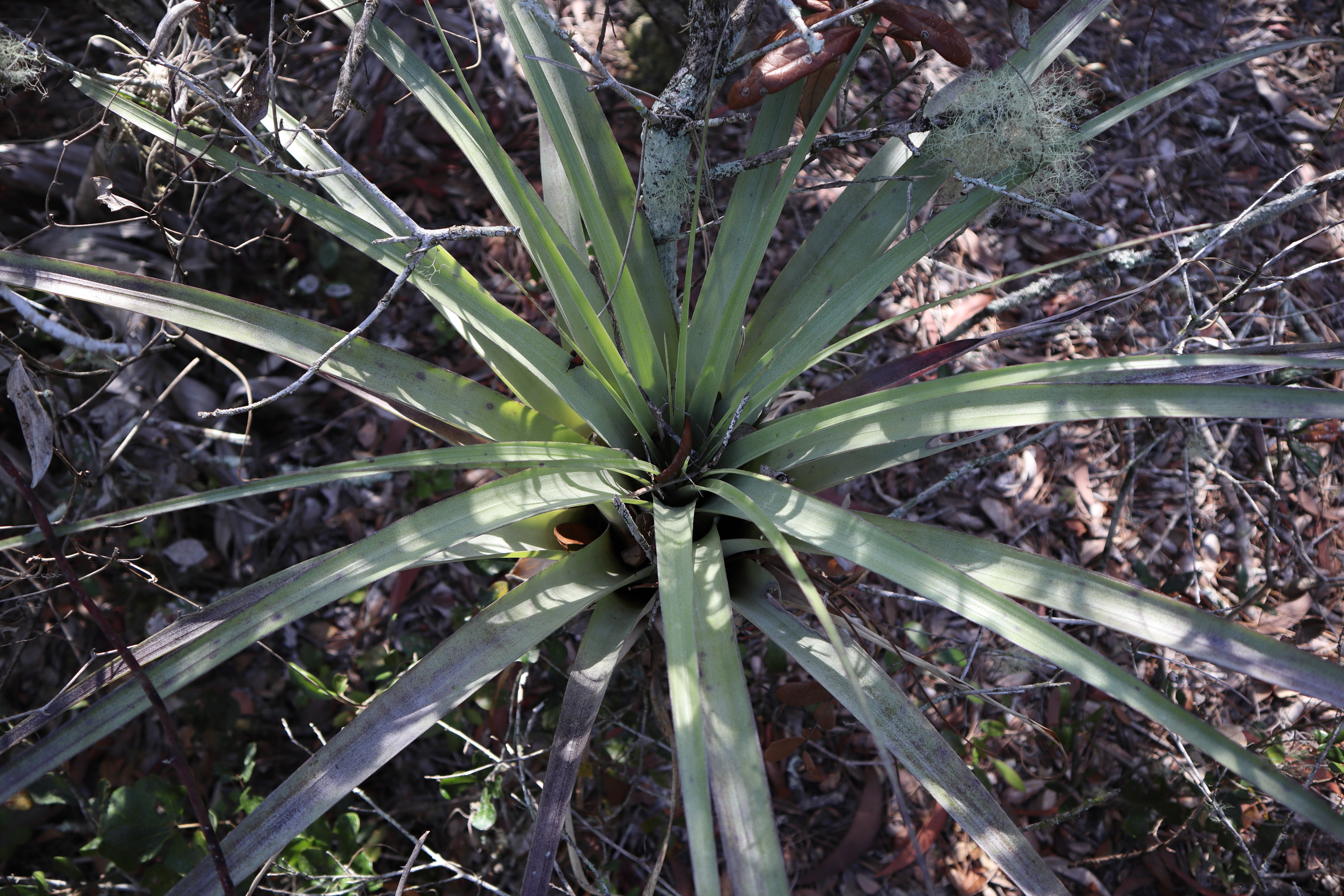
- Tillandsia utriculata

Scientific classification
- Kingdom: Plantae
- Clade: Tracheophytes
- Clade: Angiosperms
- Clade: Monocots
- Clade: Commelinids
- Order: Poales
- Family: Bromeliaceae
- Genus: Tillandsia
- Subgenus: Tillandsia subg. Tillandsia

Species
- See text

= Tillandsia subg. Tillandsia =

Subgenus of flowering plants

Tillandsia subg. Tillandsia is a subgenus of the genus Tillandsia.

== Species ==
Species accepted by Encyclopedia of Bromeliads as of October 2022:

- Tillandsia abbreviata H.Luther
- Tillandsia achyrostachys E.Morren ex Baker
- Tillandsia acuminata L.B.Sm.
- Tillandsia adamsii Read
- Tillandsia adpressiflora Mez
- Tillandsia aequatorialis L.B.Sm.
- Tillandsia aguascalientensis Gardner
- Tillandsia albida Mez & Purpus
- Tillandsia alfredo-laui Rauh & Lehmann
- Tillandsia alto-mayoensis Gouda
- Tillandsia alvareziae Rauh
- Tillandsia andreana E.Morren ex André
- Tillandsia andrieuxii (Mez) L.B.Sm.
- Tillandsia antillana L.B.Sm.
- Tillandsia arenicola L.B.Sm.
- Tillandsia argentea Griseb.
- Tillandsia ariza-juliae L.B.Sm. & J.J.Jimenez
- Tillandsia arroyoensis (W.W.Weber & Ehlers) Espejo & López-Ferrari
- Tillandsia atenangoensis Ehlers & Wuelfinghoff
- Tillandsia atitlanensis Mó, García-Martínez & Monzón
- Tillandsia atroviolacea Ehlers & Koide
- Tillandsia australis Mez
- Tillandsia baileyi Rose ex Small
- Tillandsia bakiorum H.Luther
- Tillandsia balbisiana Schult. & Schult.f.
- Tillandsia baliophylla Harms
- Tillandsia barbeyana Wittm.
- Tillandsia bartramii Elliott
- Tillandsia belloensis W.Weber
- Tillandsia biflora Ruiz & Pav.
- Tillandsia bochilensis Ehlers
- Tillandsia boliviana Mez
- Tillandsia bongarana L.B.Sm.
- Tillandsia borealis Lopez-Ferrari & Espejo-Serna
- Tillandsia borinquensis Cedeño-Maldonado & Proctor
- Tillandsia borjaensis Manzan. & W. Till
- Tillandsia botterii E.Morren ex Baker
- Tillandsia bourgaei Baker
- Tillandsia brachycaulos Schltdl.
- Tillandsia brenneri Rauh
- Tillandsia brevilingua Mez ex Harms
- Tillandsia brevior L.B.Sm.
- Tillandsia breviturneri Betancur & N.Garc¡a
- Tillandsia bulbosa Hook.f.
- Tillandsia buseri Mez
- Tillandsia butzii Mez
- Tillandsia cajamarcensis Rauh
- Tillandsia calcicola L.B.Sm. & Proctor
- Tillandsia califani Rauh
- Tillandsia callichroma L.Hrom.
- Tillandsia calochlamys Ehlers & L.Hrom.
- Tillandsia calothyrsus Mez
- Tillandsia caloura Harms
- Tillandsia candelifera Rohweder
- Tillandsia canescens Sw.
- Tillandsia capistranoensis Ehlers & W.Weber
- Tillandsia capitata Griseb.
- Tillandsia caput-medusae E.Morren
- Tillandsia carlos-hankii Matuda
- Tillandsia carlsoniae L.B.Sm.
- Tillandsia carnosa L.B.Sm.
- Tillandsia carrierei André
- Tillandsia carrilloi Véliz & U.Feldhoff
- Tillandsia cauliflora Mez & Wercklé
- Tillandsia cauligera Mez
- Tillandsia cees-goudae Gouda
- Tillandsia celata Ehlers & Lautner
- Tillandsia cernua L.B.Sm.
- Tillandsia cerosa W. Till & Barfuss
- Tillandsia cerrateana L.B.Sm.
- Tillandsia chaetophylla Mez
- Tillandsia chalcatzingensis González-Rocha, Cerros, López-Ferr. & Espejo
- Tillandsia chapalillaensis Ehlers & J.Lautner
- Tillandsia chartacea L.B.Sm.
- Tillandsia chiapensis Gardner
- Tillandsia chlorophylla L.B.Sm.
- Tillandsia churinensis Rauh
- Tillandsia circinnatioides Matuda
- Tillandsia clavigera Mez
- Tillandsia coalcomanensis Ehlers
- Tillandsia coinaensis Ehlers
- Tillandsia comitanensis Ehlers
- Tillandsia compacta Griseb.
- Tillandsia complachroma Rauh
- Tillandsia complamergens Manzanares ined.
- Tillandsia complanata Benth.
- Tillandsia complarensis x
- Tillandsia concolor L.B.Sm.
- Tillandsia confertiflora André
- Tillandsia confinis L.B.Sm.
- Tillandsia copalaensis Ehlers
- Tillandsia copanensis Rauh & Rutschmann
- Tillandsia cossonii Baker
- Tillandsia cretacea L.B.Sm.
- Tillandsia crista-galli Ehlers
- Tillandsia cryptantha Baker
- Tillandsia cryptopoda L.B.Sm.
- Tillandsia cuatrecasasii L.B.Sm.
- Tillandsia cucaensis Wittm.
- Tillandsia cucullata L.B.Sm.
- Tillandsia dasyliriifolia Baker
- Tillandsia deflexa L.B.Sm.
- Tillandsia delicata Ehlers
- Tillandsia demissa L.B.Sm.
- Tillandsia denudata André
- Tillandsia deppeana Steud.
- Tillandsia dexteri H.Luther
- Tillandsia dichromantha Hern.-Cárdenas, López-Ferr. & Espejo
- Tillandsia dichrophylla L.B.Sm.
- Tillandsia diguetii Mez & Rol.-Goss. ex Mez
- Tillandsia disticha Kunth
- Tillandsia divaricata Benth. emend. Gouda
- Tillandsia dorotheehaseae Hase
- Tillandsia dugesii Baker
- Tillandsia dura Baker
- Tillandsia durangensis Rauh & Ehlers
- Tillandsia ecarinata L.B.Sm.
- Tillandsia edithae Rauh
- Tillandsia ehlersiana Rauh
- Tillandsia eistetteri Ehlers
- Tillandsia eizii L.B.Sm.
- Tillandsia elizabethae Rauh
- Tillandsia elongata Kunth
- Tillandsia elusiva Pinzón, I.Ramírez & Carnevali
- Tillandsia elvirae-grossiae W.Rauh
- Tillandsia emergens Mez & Sodiro
- Tillandsia ermitae L.Hrom.
- Tillandsia erubescens Schltdl.
- Tillandsia escahuascensis Espejo, López-Ferrari, Ceja & A.Mendoza
- Tillandsia excavata L.B.Sm.
- Tillandsia excelsa Griseb.
- Tillandsia exserta Fernald
- Tillandsia extensa Mez
- Tillandsia fasciculata Sw.
- Tillandsia fascifolia Flores-Cruz & Valentina
- Tillandsia fassettii L.B.Sm.
- Tillandsia fendlanata x
- Tillandsia fendleri Grisebach
- Tillandsia ferreyrae L.B.Sm.
- Tillandsia ferrisiana L.B.Sm.
- Tillandsia festucoides Brongn. ex Mez
- Tillandsia filifolia Schltdl. & Cham.
- Tillandsia flabellata Baker
- Tillandsia flagellata L.B.Sm.
- Tillandsia flavobracteata Matuda
- Tillandsia flexuosa Sw.
- Tillandsia floresensis Ehlers
- Tillandsia floribunda Kunth
- Tillandsia foliosa M.Martens & Galeotti
- Tillandsia francisci W.Till & J.R.Grant
- Tillandsia fresnilloensis W.Weber & Ehlers
- Tillandsia fuchsii W.Till
- Tillandsia funckiana Baker
- Tillandsia fusiformis L.B.Sm.
- Tillandsia gerd-muelleri W.Weber
- Tillandsia glabrior (L.B.Sm.) López-Ferr., Espejo & I.Ramírez
- Tillandsia glauca L.B.Sm.
- Tillandsia gloriae F. Gruber, W. Till & Barfuss
- Tillandsia glossophylla L.B.Sm.
- Tillandsia gracillima L.B.Sm.
- Tillandsia graebeneri Mez
- Tillandsia grovesiae Manzan. & W. Till
- Tillandsia guatemalensis L.B.Sm.
- Tillandsia guenther-nolleri Ehlers
- Tillandsia guerreroensis Rauh
- Tillandsia gymnobotrya Baker
- Tillandsia hammeri Rauh & Ehlers
- Tillandsia harrisii Ehlers
- Tillandsia heliconioides Kunth
- Tillandsia heterophylla E.Morren
- Tillandsia hildae Rauh
- Tillandsia hintoniana L.B.Sm.
- Tillandsia hirtzii W Rauh
- Tillandsia hoeijeri H.Luther
- Tillandsia hondurensis Rauh
- Tillandsia hotteana Urb.
- Tillandsia hromadnikiana Ehlers
- Tillandsia huajuapanensis Ehlers & Lautner
- Tillandsia huamelulaensis Ehlers
- Tillandsia huarazensis Ehlers & W.Till
- Tillandsia humboldtii Baker
- Tillandsia ilseana W.Till, Halbritter & Zecher
- Tillandsia imperialis E.Morren ex Roezl
- Tillandsia imporaensis Ehlers
- Tillandsia incarnata Kunth
- Tillandsia indigofera Mez & Sodiro
- Tillandsia intermedia Mez
- Tillandsia interrupta Mez
- Tillandsia ionantha Planch.
- Tillandsia ionochroma André ex Mez
- Tillandsia izabalensis Pinzón
- Tillandsia jaguactalensis I.Ramirez,Camevali & Chi
- Tillandsia jaliscopinicola L.Hrom. & P.Schneider
- Tillandsia joel-mandimboensis Flores-Cruz, C. Granados & Vázquez-Hurtado
- Tillandsia juerg-rutschmannii Rauh
- Tillandsia juncea (Ruiz & Pav.) Poir.
- Tillandsia kalmbacheri Matuda
- Tillandsia kammii Rauh
- Tillandsia karwinskyana Schult. & Schult.f.
- Tillandsia kauffmannii Ehlers
- Tillandsia kegeliana Mez
- Tillandsia kessleri H.Luther
- Tillandsia kirchhoffiana Wittm.
- Tillandsia klausii Ehlers
- Tillandsia koideae Rauh & E.Gross
- Tillandsia kolbii W.Till & Schatzl
- Tillandsia krahnii Rauh
- Tillandsia kretzii Ehlers & Lautner
- Tillandsia krukoffiana L.B.Sm.
- Tillandsia kuntzeana Mez
- Tillandsia lagunaensis Ehlers
- Tillandsia lajensis André
- Tillandsia laminata L.B.Sm.
- Tillandsia lampropoda L.B.Sm.
- Tillandsia langlasseana Mez
- Tillandsia latifolia Meyen
- Tillandsia laui Matuda
- Tillandsia lautneri Ehlers
- Tillandsia leiboldiana Schltdl.
- Tillandsia leucolepis L.B.Sm.
- Tillandsia limae L.B.Sm.
- Tillandsia limarum E.Pereira
- Tillandsia limbata Schltdl.
- Tillandsia lineatispica Mez
- Tillandsia loma-blancae Ehlers & Lautner
- Tillandsia longifolia Baker
- Tillandsia lopezii L.B.Sm.
- Tillandsia loxensis Jaramillo, Manzanares & Gutiérrez
- Tillandsia loxichaensis Ehlers
- Tillandsia lucida E.Morren ex Baker
- Tillandsia lydiae Ehlers
- Tillandsia lymanii Rauh
- Tillandsia macdougallii L.B.Sm.
- Tillandsia machupicchuensis Gouda & J.Ochoa
- Tillandsia macrochlamys Baker
- Tillandsia macrodactylon Mez
- Tillandsia maculata Ruiz & Pav.
- Tillandsia macvaughii Espejo & López-Ferrari
- Tillandsia magnusiana Wittm.
- Tillandsia makoyana Baker
- Tillandsia makrinii L.Hrom.
- Tillandsia malzinei (E.Morren) Baker
- Tillandsia marabascoensis Ehlers & Lautner
- Tillandsia marnieri-lapostollei Rauh
- Tillandsia mateoensis Ehlers
- Tillandsia matudae L.B.Sm.
- Tillandsia maya I.Ramırez & Carnevali
- Tillandsia may-patii I.Ramirez & Camevali
- Tillandsia mazatlanensis Rauh
- Tillandsia melanocrater L.B.Sm.emend.Gouda
- Tillandsia micans L.B.Sm.
- Tillandsia mima L.B.Sm.
- Tillandsia mirabilis L.Hrom.
- Tillandsia mitlaensis Weber & Ehlers
- Tillandsia mixtecorum Ehlers & Koide
- Tillandsia mooreana L.B.Sm.
- Tillandsia moronesensis Ehlers
- Tillandsia moscosoi L.B.Sm. & J.J.Jimenez
- Tillandsia multicaulis Steud.
- Tillandsia naundorffiae Rauh & Barthlott
- Tillandsia nervata L.B.Sm.
- Tillandsia nervisepala (Gilmartin) L.B.Sm.
- Tillandsia nicolasensis Ehlers
- Tillandsia nizandaensis Ehlers
- Tillandsia nolleriana Ehlers
- Tillandsia novakii H.Luther
- Tillandsia nuyooensis Ehlers
- Tillandsia oaxacana L.B.Sm.
- Tillandsia occulta H.Luther
- Tillandsia oerstediana L.B.Sm.
- Tillandsia orbicularis L.B.Sm.
- Tillandsia orogenes Standl. & L.O.Williams
- Tillandsia oroyensis Mez
- Tillandsia ortgiesiana E.Morren ex Mez
- Tillandsia ovatispicata Gouda
- Tillandsia oxapampae Rauh & von Bismarck
- Tillandsia pachyaxon L.B.Sm.
- Tillandsia pacifica Ehlers
- Tillandsia pallescens Betancur & N.Garc¡a
- Tillandsia pamelae Rauh
- Tillandsia paniculata (L.) L.
- Tillandsia paraensis Mez
- Tillandsia paraisoensis Ehlers
- Tillandsia parryi Baker
- Tillandsia parvispica Baker
- Tillandsia pastensis André
- Tillandsia paucifolia Baker
- Tillandsia penascoensis Ehlers & Lautner
- Tillandsia pentasticha Rauh & Wülfinghoff
- Tillandsia pinicola I.Ramírez & Carnevali
- Tillandsia pinnatodigitata Mez
- Tillandsia plagiotropica Rohweder
- Tillandsia platyphylla Mez
- Tillandsia polita L.B.Sm.
- Tillandsia polyantha Mez & Sodiro
- Tillandsia polystachia (L.) L.
- Tillandsia pomacochae Rauh
- Tillandsia ponderosa L.B.Sm.
- Tillandsia porvenirensis Ehlers
- Tillandsia praschekii Ehlers & Willinger
- Tillandsia pringlei S.Watson
- Tillandsia prodigiosa (Lem.) Baker
- Tillandsia propagulifera Rauh
- Tillandsia pruinosa Sw.
- Tillandsia pseudobaileyi Gardner
- Tillandsia pseudofloribunda Gouda
- Tillandsia pseudomicans Rauh
- Tillandsia pseudooaxacana Ehlers
- Tillandsia pseudosetacea Ehlers & Rauh
- Tillandsia pueblensis L.B.Sm.
- Tillandsia punctulata Schltdl. & Cham.
- Tillandsia purpurascens Rauh
- Tillandsia pyramidata André
- Tillandsia quaquaflorifera Matuda
- Tillandsia queretaroensis Ehlers
- Tillandsia queroensis Gilmartin
- Tillandsia raackii H.Luther
- Tillandsia racinae L.B.Sm.
- Tillandsia rangelensis L.Hechavarria
- Tillandsia rariflora André
- Tillandsia rauhii L.B.Sm.
- Tillandsia rauschii Rauh & Lehmann
- Tillandsia rayonesensis Ehlers
- Tillandsia religiosa Hern.-Cárdenas, González-Rocha, Espejo, López-Ferr., Cerros & Ehlers
- Tillandsia remota Wittm.
- Tillandsia renateae Gouda, Manzan. & Raack
- Tillandsia restrepoana André
- Tillandsia reuteri Rauh
- Tillandsia reversa L.B.Sm.
- Tillandsia rhodocephala Ehlers & Koide
- Tillandsia rhodosticta L.B.Sm.
- Tillandsia rhomboidea André
- Tillandsia riohondoensis Ehlers
- Tillandsia riverae Manzan. & W. Till
- Tillandsia rodrigueziana Mez
- Tillandsia roezlii hort. Linden ex Ortgies emend E.Morren
- Tillandsia roland-gosselinii Mez
- Tillandsia romeroi L.B.Sm.
- Tillandsia roseoscapa Matuda
- Tillandsia roseospicata Matuda
- Tillandsia rothii Rauh
- Tillandsia rotundata (L.B.Sm.) Gardner
- Tillandsia rubella Baker
- Tillandsia rubia Ehlers & L.Colgan
- Tillandsia rubrispica Ehlers & Koide
- Tillandsia rubroviolacea Rauh
- Tillandsia rudolfii E.Gross & Hase
- Tillandsia rusbyi Baker
- Tillandsia sagasteguii L.B.Sm.
- Tillandsia salmonea Ehlers
- Tillandsia samaipatensis W.Till
- Tillandsia sangii Ehlers
- Tillandsia santieusebii Morillo & Oliva-Esteve
- Tillandsia santosiae Ehlers
- Tillandsia scaposa (L.B. Sm.) Ehlers�
- Tillandsia sceptriformis Mez & Sodiro
- Tillandsia schatzlii Rauh
- Tillandsia schiedeana Steud.
- Tillandsia schimperiana Wittm.
- Tillandsia schreiteri Lillo & A.Cast.
- Tillandsia schultzei Harms
- Tillandsia schusteri Rauh
- Tillandsia secunda Kunth
- Tillandsia seleriana Mez
- Tillandsia selleana Harms
- Tillandsia sessemocinoi Lopez-Ferrari Espejo & P.Blanco
- Tillandsia setacea Sw.
- Tillandsia setiformis Ehlers
- Tillandsia sierrahalensis Espejo et Lopez-Ferrari
- Tillandsia sierrajuarezensis Matuda
- Tillandsia sigmoidea L.B.Sm.
- Tillandsia simulata Small
- Tillandsia socialis L.B.Sm.
- Tillandsia sodiroi Mez
- Tillandsia somnians L.B.Sm.
- Tillandsia sphaerocephala Baker
- Tillandsia spiraliflora Rauh
- Tillandsia standleyi L.B.Sm.
- Tillandsia steiropoda L.B.Sm.
- Tillandsia stenlanata x
- Tillandsia stenoura Harms
- Tillandsia stipitata L.B.Sm.
- Tillandsia stoltenii Ehlers
- Tillandsia streptophylla Scheidw. ex C.Morren
- Tillandsia subconcolor L.B.Sm.
- Tillandsia subinflata L.B.Sm.
- Tillandsia subteres H.Luther
- Tillandsia subulifera Mez
- Tillandsia suescana L.B.Sm.
- Tillandsia suesilliae Espejo, López-Ferrari & W.Till
- Tillandsia superba Mez & Sodiro
- Tillandsia superinsignis Matuda
- Tillandsia supermexicana Matuda
- Tillandsia takizawae Ehlers & H.Luther
- Tillandsia taxcoensis Ehlers
- Tillandsia tecolometl Granados
- Tillandsia tecpanensis Ehlers & Jürgen Lautner
- Tillandsia tehuacana I.Ramírez & Carnevali
- Tillandsia teres L.B.Sm.
- Tillandsia thyrsigera E.Morren ex Baker
- Tillandsia tillii Ehlers
- Tillandsia tonalaensis Ehlers
- Tillandsia tovarensis Mez
- Tillandsia tragophoba Dillon
- Tillandsia trauneri L.Hrom.
- Tillandsia tricolor Schltdl. & Cham.
- Tillandsia trigalensis Ehlers
- Tillandsia truxillana L.B.Sm.
- Tillandsia turneri Baker
- Tillandsia turquinensis Willinger, K. & Michalek
- Tillandsia ulrici Ehlers
- Tillandsia ultima L.B.Sm.
- Tillandsia utriculata L.
- Tillandsia vanhyningii (M.B. Foster) Beutelspacher & García-Martínez
- Tillandsia variabilis Schltdl.
- Tillandsia veleziana Manzan. & W. Till
- Tillandsia velickiana L.B.Sm.
- Tillandsia velutina Ehlers
- Tillandsia ventanaensis Ehlers & Koide
- Tillandsia verapazana Ehlers
- Tillandsia vicentina Standl.
- Tillandsia violacea Baker
- Tillandsia violascens Mez
- Tillandsia vriesioides Matuda
- Tillandsia walteri Mez
- Tillandsia weberi L.Hrom. & P.Schneider
- Tillandsia werdermannii Harms
- Tillandsia werner-rauhiana P.Koide-Hyatt & H.Takizawa
- Tillandsia wilinskii Gouda
- Tillandsia wisdomiana Isley
- Tillandsia wuelfinghoffii Ehlers
- Tillandsia wurdackii L.B.Sm.
- Tillandsia xerographica Rohweder
- Tillandsia yerba-santae Ehlers
- Tillandsia yunckeri L.B.Sm.
- Tillandsia yutaninoensis Ehlers & Lautner
- Tillandsia zacapanensis Véliz & U.Feldhoff
- Tillandsia zacualpanensis Ehlers & Wülfinghoff
- Tillandsia zaragozaensis Ehlers
- Tillandsia zaratensis W.Weber
- Tillandsia zarumensis Gilmartin
- Tillandsia zoquensis Ehlers
