= Tillandsia cucaensis =

Scientific classification
- Kingdom: Plantae
- Clade: Embryophytes
- Clade: Tracheophytes
- Clade: Spermatophytes
- Clade: Angiosperms
- Clade: Monocots
- Clade: Commelinids
- Order: Poales
- Family: Bromeliaceae
- Genus: Tillandsia
- Subgenus: Tillandsia subg. Tillandsia
- Species: T. cucaensis

Binomial name
- Tillandsia cucaensis Wittm.

Synonyms
- Tillandsia aesii I.Ramírez & Carnevali

Species of epiphyte

Tillandsia cucaensis is a species in the genus Tillandsia. This species is native to Costa Rica, El Salvador, Guatemala, Honduras, Mexico and Nicaragua. It was first described in 1891.
