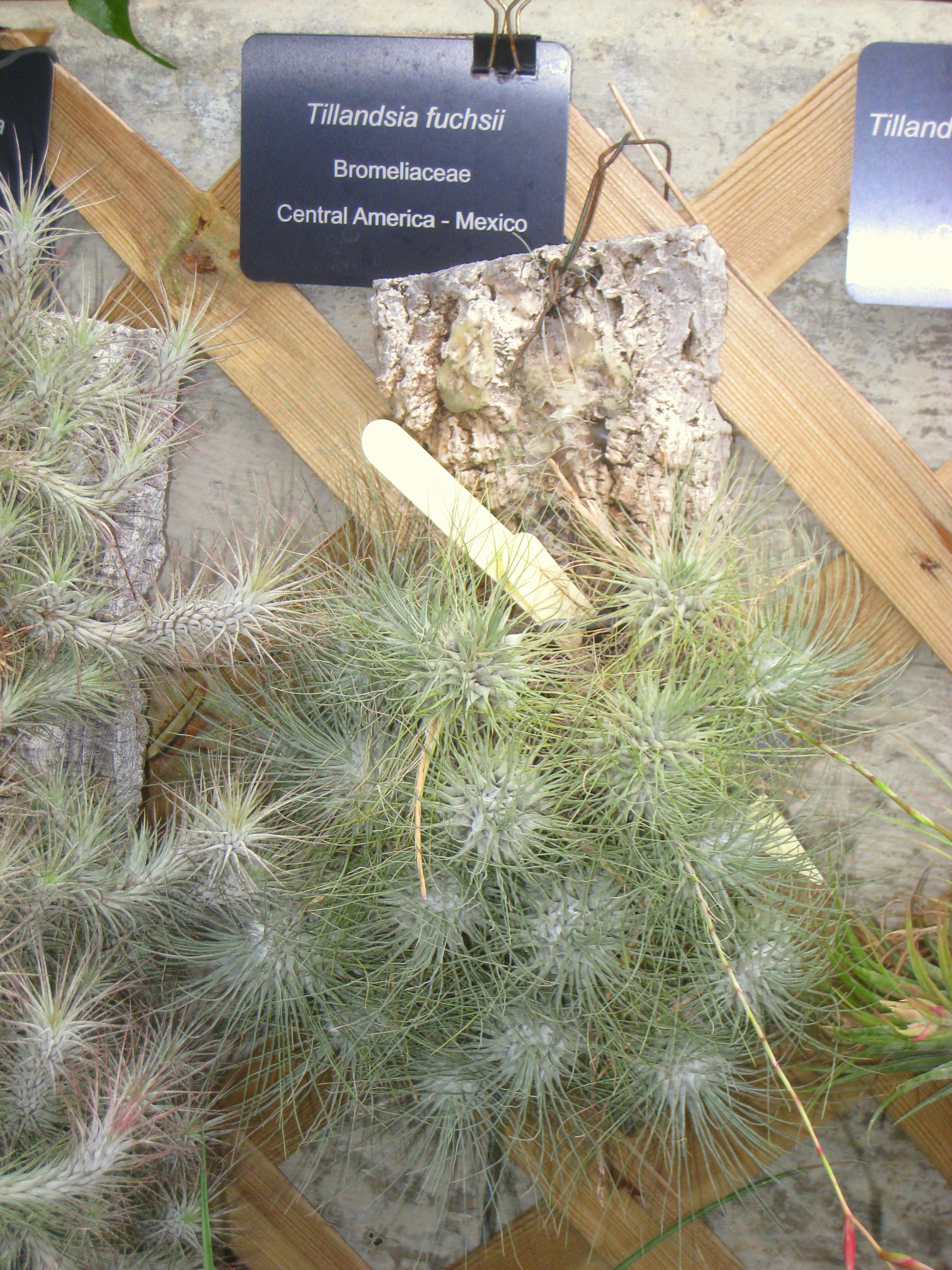

Scientific classification
- Kingdom: Plantae
- Clade: Tracheophytes
- Clade: Angiosperms
- Clade: Monocots
- Clade: Commelinids
- Order: Poales
- Family: Bromeliaceae
- Genus: Tillandsia
- Subgenus: Tillandsia subg. Tillandsia
- Species: T. fuchsii

Binomial name
- Tillandsia fuchsii W.Till

= Tillandsia fuchsii =

Species of plant

Tillandsia fuchsii is a species of flowering plant in the genus Tillandsia. This species is native to Mexico and Guatemala.

== Cultivars ==
- Tillandsia 'Millenium'
- Tillandsia 'Tisn't'
