= Tillandsia zoquensis =

Scientific classification
- Kingdom: Plantae
- Clade: Tracheophytes
- Clade: Angiosperms
- Clade: Monocots
- Clade: Commelinids
- Order: Poales
- Family: Bromeliaceae
- Genus: Tillandsia
- Subgenus: Tillandsia subg. Tillandsia
- Species: T. zoquensis

Binomial name
- Tillandsia zoquensis Ehlers

Synonyms

Species of plant

Tillandsia zoquensis is a species of flowering plant in the family Bromeliaceae, endemic to southeastern Mexico. It was first described by Renate Ehlers in 2002.
