= Tillandsia izabalensis =

Scientific classification
- Kingdom: Plantae
- Clade: Tracheophytes
- Clade: Angiosperms
- Clade: Monocots
- Clade: Commelinids
- Order: Poales
- Family: Bromeliaceae
- Genus: Tillandsia
- Subgenus: Tillandsia subg. Tillandsia
- Species: T. izabalensis

Binomial name
- Tillandsia izabalensis Pinzón, I.Ramírez & Carnevali

Species of flowering plant

Tillandsia izabalensis is a species of flowering plant in the family Bromeliaceae, native to Belize, Guatemala, Honduras and Nicaragua in Central America, and in the south-west Caribbean. It was first described in 2012.
