= Tillandsia parryi =

Scientific classification
- Kingdom: Plantae
- Clade: Tracheophytes
- Clade: Angiosperms
- Clade: Monocots
- Clade: Commelinids
- Order: Poales
- Family: Bromeliaceae
- Genus: Tillandsia
- Subgenus: Tillandsia subg. Tillandsia
- Species: T. parryi

Binomial name
- Tillandsia parryi Baker

Species of plant

Tillandsia parryi is a species of flowering plant in the family Bromeliaceae. This species is endemic to Mexico.
