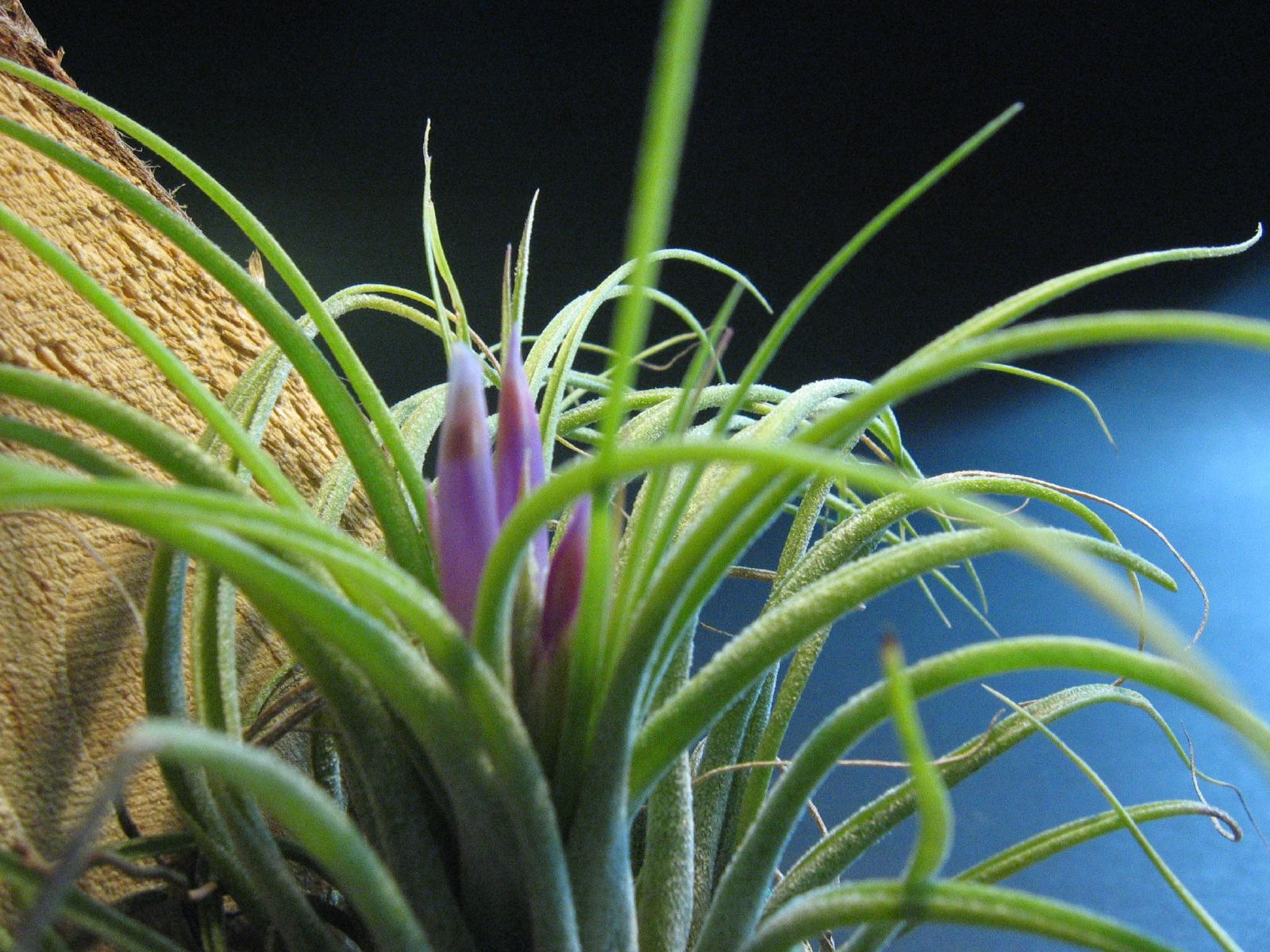

Scientific classification
- Kingdom: Plantae
- Clade: Tracheophytes
- Clade: Angiosperms
- Clade: Monocots
- Clade: Commelinids
- Order: Poales
- Family: Bromeliaceae
- Genus: Tillandsia
- Subgenus: Tillandsia subg. Tillandsia
- Species: T. kolbii

Binomial name
- Tillandsia kolbii W.Till & Schatzl

Synonyms
- Tillandsia ionantha var. scaposa L.B.Sm.

= Tillandsia kolbii =

Species of plant

Tillandsia kolbii is a species of flowering plant in the genus Tillandsia. This species is native to Oaxaca, Chiapas, and Guatemala.

== Cultivars ==
- Tillandsia 'First Born'
