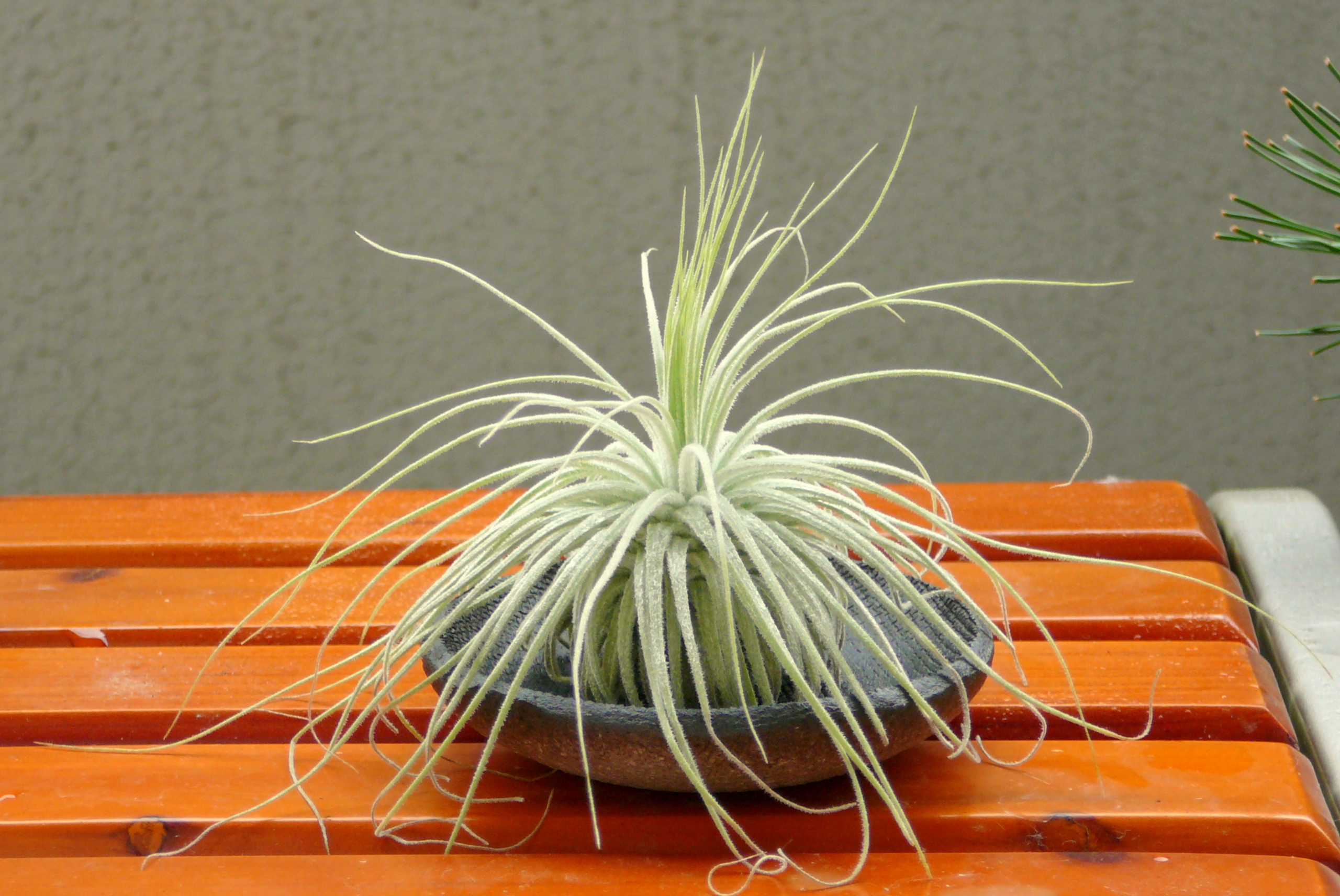

Scientific classification
- Kingdom: Plantae
- Clade: Tracheophytes
- Clade: Angiosperms
- Clade: Monocots
- Clade: Commelinids
- Order: Poales
- Family: Bromeliaceae
- Genus: Tillandsia
- Subgenus: Tillandsia subg. Tillandsia
- Species: T. magnusiana

Binomial name
- Tillandsia magnusiana Wittm.

Synonyms
- Tillandsia plumosa var. magnusiana (Wittm.) Rohweder

= Tillandsia magnusiana =

Species of plant

Tillandsia magnusiana is a species of flowering plant in the genus Tillandsia. This species is native to southern and western Mexico (Jalisco, Veracruz, Guerrero, Oaxaca, Chiapas), El Salvador, Nicaragua and Honduras.

== Cultivars ==
- Tillandsia 'Magic Blush'
