= List of Tillandsia species =

List of species

As of October 2022, Plants of the World Online accepted about 660 species and hybrids in the genus Tillandsia.

== A ==
- Tillandsia abbreviata H.Luther
- Tillandsia abdita L.B.Sm.
- Tillandsia achyrostachys E. Morren ex Baker
- Tillandsia acuminata L.B.Sm.
- Tillandsia adamsii R.W. Read
- Tillandsia adpressiflora Mez
- Tillandsia aequatorialis L.B.Sm.
- Tillandsia aeranthos (Loiseleur) L.B.Sm.
- Tillandsia afonsoana T.Strehl
- Tillandsia aguascalientensis Gardner
- Tillandsia aizoides Mez
- Tillandsia albertiana F. Vervoorst
- Tillandsia albida Mez & Purpus
- Tillandsia alfredo-laui Rauh & Lehmann
- Tillandsia alto-mayoensis Gouda
- Tillandsia alvareziae Rauh
- Tillandsia andicola Griseb. ex Baker
- Tillandsia andreana E. Morren ex André
- Tillandsia andrieuxii (Mez) L.B.Sm.
- Tillandsia angulosa Mez
- Tillandsia antillana L.B.Sm.
- Tillandsia appenii (Rauh) J.R.Grant
- Tillandsia araujei Mez
- Tillandsia archeri L.B.Sm.
- Tillandsia arenicola L.B.Sm.
- Tillandsia arequitae (André) André ex Mez
- Tillandsia argentea Griseb.
- Tillandsia argentina C.H.Wright
- Tillandsia arhiza Mez
- Tillandsia ariza-juliae L.B.Sm. & Jiménez
- Tillandsia arroyoensis (W.Weber & Ehlers) Espejo & López-Ferrari
- Tillandsia atenangoensis Ehlers & Wülfinghoff
- Tillandsia atroviolacea Ehlers & Koide
- Tillandsia atroviridipetala Matuda
- Tillandsia aurea Mez
- Tillandsia australis Mez

== B ==
- Tillandsia bagua-grandensis Rauh
- Tillandsia baileyi Rose ex Small
- Tillandsia bakiorum H.Luther
- Tillandsia balbisiana Schultes f.
- Tillandsia baliophylla Harms
- Tillandsia balsasensis Rauh
- Tillandsia bandensis Baker
- Tillandsia × baptistana C.N.Gonç. & Azevêdo-Gonç.
- Tillandsia barbeyana Wittmack
- Tillandsia barclayana Baker
- Tillandsia barfussii W.Till
- Tillandsia barrosoae W. Till
- Tillandsia barthlottii Rauh
- Tillandsia bartramii Elliott
- Tillandsia bella T.Strehl
- Tillandsia belloensis W.Weber
- Tillandsia bergeri Mez
- Tillandsia × bergiana H. Takizawa & P. Koide
- Tillandsia bermejoensis H. Hromadnik
- Tillandsia biflora Ruiz & Pav.
- Tillandsia bismarckii Rauh & Lehmann
- Tillandsia bochilensis Ehlers
- Tillandsia boliviana Mez
- Tillandsia bongarana L.B.Sm.
- Tillandsia bonita Versieux & Martinelli
- Tillandsia boqueronensis Ehlers
- Tillandsia borealis López-Ferrari & Espejo-Serna
- Tillandsia borinquensis Cedeño-Maldonado & Proctor
- Tillandsia borjaensis Manzan. & W.Till
- Tillandsia botterii É.Morren ex Baker
- Tillandsia bourgaei Baker
- Tillandsia brachycaulos Schlecht.
- Tillandsia brachyphylla Baker
- Tillandsia brealitoensis L. Hromadnik
- Tillandsia brenneri Rauh
- Tillandsia brevicapsula Gilmartin
- Tillandsia brevilingua Mez ex Harms
- Tillandsia brevior L.B.Sm.
- Tillandsia breviturneri Betancur & N. García
- Tillandsia buchlohii Rauh
- Tillandsia bulbosa Hook.
- Tillandsia buseri Mez
- Tillandsia butzii Mez

== C ==
- Tillandsia caballosensis Ehlers
- Tillandsia cacticola L.B.Sm.
- Tillandsia caerulea Kunth
- Tillandsia cajamarcensis Rauh
- Tillandsia calcicola L.B.Sm. & Proctor
- Tillandsia califani Rauh
- Tillandsia caliginosa W. Till
- Tillandsia callichroma L. Hromadnik
- Tillandsia calochlamys Ehlers & L. Hromadnik
- Tillandsia calothyrsus Mez
- Tillandsia caloura Harms
- Tillandsia camargoensis L. Hromadnik
- Tillandsia candelifera Rohweder
- Tillandsia candida Leme
- Tillandsia canescens Swartz
- Tillandsia capillaris Ruiz & Pav.
- Tillandsia capistranoensis Ehlers & Weber
- Tillandsia capitata Griseb.
- Tillandsia caput-medusae E. Morren
- Tillandsia cardenasii L.B.Sm.
- Tillandsia carlos-hankii Matuda
- Tillandsia carlsoniae L.B.Sm.
- Tillandsia carminea W. Till
- Tillandsia carnosa L.B.Sm.
- Tillandsia carrierei André
- Tillandsia carrilloi Véliz & Feldhoff
- Tillandsia castelensis Leme & W.Till
- Tillandsia castellanii L.B.Sm.
- Tillandsia catimbauensis Leme, W. Till & J.A. Siqueira
- Tillandsia caulescens Brongniart ex Baker
- Tillandsia cauliflora Mez & Wercklé ex Mez
- Tillandsia cauligera Mez
- Tillandsia cees-goudae Gouda
- Tillandsia celata Ehlers & Lautner
- Tillandsia cernua L.B.Sm.
- Tillandsia cerrateana L.B.Sm.
- Tillandsia chaetophylla Mez
- Tillandsia chalcatzingensis Gonz.-Rocha, Cerros, López-Ferr. & Espejo
- Tillandsia chapalillaensis Ehlers & Lautner
- Tillandsia chapeuensis Rauh
- Tillandsia chartacea L.B.Sm.
- Tillandsia chasmophyta Büneker, R.Pontes & K.Soares
- Tillandsia chiapensis Gardner
- Tillandsia chiletensis Rauh
- Tillandsia chingacensis Aguirre-Santoro, Hernández-A., Hernández-Rodríguez, Betancur
- Tillandsia chlorophylla L.B.Sm.
- Tillandsia chontalensis Baker
- Tillandsia churinensis Rauh
- Tillandsia chusgonensis L. Hromadnik
- Tillandsia circinnatioides Matuda
- Tillandsia clavigera Mez
- Tillandsia coalcomanensis Ehlers
- Tillandsia cochabambae E. Gross & Rauh
- Tillandsia coinaensis Ehlers
- Tillandsia colganii Ehlers
- Tillandsia colorata L.Hrom.
- Tillandsia comarapaensis H.Luther
- Tillandsia comitanensis Ehlers
- Tillandsia compacta Griseb.
- Tillandsia complanata Benth.
- Tillandsia compressa Bertero ex Schultes f.
- Tillandsia comulcoensis Ehlers
- Tillandsia concolor L.B.Sm.
- Tillandsia confertiflora André
- Tillandsia confinis L.B.Sm.
- Tillandsia copalaensis Ehlers
- Tillandsia copanensis Rauh & Rutschmann
- Tillandsia copynii Gouda
- Tillandsia × cornissaensis Gouda
- Tillandsia × correalei H.Luther
- Tillandsia cossonii Baker
- Tillandsia cotagaitensis L. Hromadnik
- Tillandsia crenulipetala Mez
- Tillandsia cretacea L.B.Sm.
- Tillandsia crista-galli Ehlers (also spelt Tillandsia crista-gallii)
- Tillandsia crocata (E. Morren) Baker
- Tillandsia cryptopoda L.B.Sm.
- Tillandsia cuatrecasasii L.B.Sm.
- Tillandsia cucaensis Wittmack
- Tillandsia × cuchnichim R. Guess & V. Guess
- Tillandsia cucullata L.B.Sm.
- Tillandsia curvifolia (Ehlers & Rauh) Ehlers

== D ==
- Tillandsia dasyliriifolia Baker
- Tillandsia deflexa L.B.Sm.
- Tillandsia delicata Ehlers
- Tillandsia demissa L.B.Sm.
- Tillandsia denudata André
- Tillandsia deppeana Steudel
- Tillandsia dexteri H.Luther
- Tillandsia diaguitensis Castellanos
- Tillandsia dichromantha Hern.-Cárdenas, López-Ferr. & Espejo
- Tillandsia dichrophylla L.B.Sm.
- Tillandsia didisticha (E. Morren) Baker
- Tillandsia didistichoides Mez
- Tillandsia diguetii Mez & Roland-Gosselin ex Mez
- Tillandsia disticha Kunth
- Tillandsia × donatoi Leme
- Tillandsia dorisdaltoniae P.L. Ibisch, R. Vásquez, I.G. Vargas & W. Till
- Tillandsia dorotheae Rauh
- Tillandsia dorotheehaseae Hase
- Tillandsia dugesii Baker
- Tillandsia dura Baker
- Tillandsia durangensis Rauh & Ehlers
- Tillandsia duratii Visiani

== E ==
- Tillandsia ecarinata L.B.Sm.
- Tillandsia edithae Rauh
- Tillandsia eistetteri Ehlers
- Tillandsia eizii L.B.Sm.
- Tillandsia elizabethae Rauh
- Tillandsia elongata Kunth
- Tillandsia eltoniana E. Pereira
- Tillandsia elusiva Pinzón, I.Ramírez & Carnevali
- Tillandsia elvirae-grossiae Rauh
- Tillandsia emergens Mez & Sodiro ex Mez
- Tillandsia engleriana Wittmack
- Tillandsia erecta Gillies ex Baker
- Tillandsia erici Ehlers
- Tillandsia ermitae L. Hromadnik
- Tillandsia erubescens Schlecht.
- Tillandsia escahuascensis Espejo, López-Ferr., Ceja & A.Mend.
- Tillandsia espinosae L.B.Sm.
- Tillandsia esseriana Rauh & L.B.Sm.
- Tillandsia excavata L.B.Sm.
- Tillandsia excelsa Griseb.
- Tillandsia exserta Fernald
- Tillandsia extensa Mez

== F ==
- Tillandsia fasciculata Swartz
- Tillandsia fascifolia Flores-Cruz & Diego-Esc.
- Tillandsia fassettii L.B.Sm.
- Tillandsia fendleri Griseb.
- Tillandsia ferreyrae L.B.Sm.
- Tillandsia ferrisiana L.B.Sm.
- Tillandsia festucoides Brongniart ex Mez
- Tillandsia filifolia Schlecht. & Chamisso
- Tillandsia flabellata Baker
- Tillandsia flagellata L.B.Sm.
- Tillandsia flavobracteata Matuda
- Tillandsia flavoviolacea Gouda
- Tillandsia flexuosa Swartz
- Tillandsia floresensis Ehlers
- Tillandsia floribunda Kunth
- Tillandsia × floridana L.B.Sm. (T. bartramii × T. fasciculata)
- Tillandsia foliosa M.Martens & Galeotti
- Tillandsia fragrans André
- Tillandsia francisci W. Till & J.R. Grant
- Tillandsia frank-hasei J.R.Grant
- Tillandsia fresnilloensis W.Weber & Ehlers
- Tillandsia friesii Mez
- Tillandsia fuchsii W. Till
- Tillandsia funebris Castellanos
- Tillandsia fusiformis L.B.Sm.

== G ==
- Tillandsia gardneri Lindley
- Tillandsia geissei Philippi
- Tillandsia geminiflora Brongniart
- Tillandsia genseri Rauh
- Tillandsia gerd-muelleri W.Weber
- Tillandsia gerdae Ehlers
- Tillandsia gilliesii Baker
- Tillandsia glabrior (L.B.Sm.) Lopez-Ferrari, Espejo & I.Ramirez
- Tillandsia glauca L.B.Sm.
- Tillandsia globosa Wawra
- Tillandsia glossophylla L.B.Sm.
- Tillandsia gracillima L.B.Sm.
- Tillandsia graebeneri Mez
- Tillandsia grandispica Ehlers
- Tillandsia grao-mogolensis Silveira
- Tillandsia grazielae Sucre & R.Braga
- Tillandsia grossispicata Espejo, López-Ferr. & W.Till
- Tillandsia grovesiae Manzan. & W.Till
- Tillandsia gruberi (Ehlers) J.R.Grant
- Tillandsia guatemalensis L.B.Sm.
- Tillandsia guelzii Rauh
- Tillandsia guenther-nolleri Ehlers
- Tillandsia guerreroensis Rauh
- Tillandsia gutteana W.Weber
- Tillandsia gymnobotrya Baker

== H ==
- Tillandsia hammeri Rauh & Ehlers
- Tillandsia hansonii Manzan. & Gouda
- Tillandsia harrisii Ehlers
- Tillandsia hasei Ehlers & L. Hromadnik
- Tillandsia hegeri Ehlers
- Tillandsia heliconioides Kunth
- Tillandsia helmutii L. Hromadnik
- Tillandsia hemkeri Rauh
- Tillandsia heterandra André
- Tillandsia heteromorpha Mez
- Tillandsia heterophylla E. Morren
- Tillandsia heubergeri Ehlers
- Tillandsia hildae Rauh
- Tillandsia hintoniana L.B.Sm.
- Tillandsia hirta W. Till & L. Hromadnik
- Tillandsia hirtzii Rauh
- Tillandsia hoeijeri H.Luther
- Tillandsia hofackeri Ehlers
- Tillandsia hondurensis Rauh
- Tillandsia horstii Rauh
- Tillandsia hotteana Urban
- Tillandsia huajuapanensis Ehlers & Lautner
- Tillandsia huamelulaensis Ehlers
- Tillandsia huarazensis Ehlers & W. Till
- Tillandsia hubertiana Matuda
- Tillandsia humilis Presl

== I ==
- Tillandsia ignesiae Mez
- Tillandsia ilseana W. Till, Halbritter & Zecher
- Tillandsia imperialis E. Morren ex Roezl
- Tillandsia imporaensis Ehlers
- Tillandsia incarnata Kunth
- Tillandsia indigofera Mez & Sodiro
- Tillandsia inopinata Espejo, López-Ferr. & W.Till
- Tillandsia intermedia Mez
- Tillandsia interrupta Mez
- Tillandsia intumescens L.B.Sm.
- Tillandsia ionantha Planchon
- Tillandsia ionochroma André ex Mez
- Tillandsia itatiensis E.H.Souza & Leodeg.
- Tillandsia itaubensis T.Strehl
- Tillandsia ixioides Griseb.
- Tillandsia izabalensis Pinzón, I.Ramírez & Carnevali

== J ==
- Tillandsia × jaguactalensis I. Ramírez, Carnevali & Chi
- Tillandsia jaliscopinicola L.Hrom. & P.Schneid. (also spelt Tillandsia jalisco-pinicola)
- Tillandsia jequiensis L.Hrom. & H.Hrom.
- Tillandsia joel-mandimboensis Flores-Cruz, C.Granados & Vázq.-Hurt.
- Tillandsia jonesii T.Strehl
- Tillandsia jucunda Castellanos
- Tillandsia juerg-rutschmannii Rauh
- Tillandsia juncea (Ruiz & Pav.) Poiret

== K ==
- Tillandsia kalmbacheri Matuda
- Tillandsia kammii Rauh
- Tillandsia karineae Manzan., Gouda & Raack
- Tillandsia karwinskyana Schultes f.
- Tillandsia kauffmannii Ehlers
- Tillandsia kautskyi E. Pereira
- Tillandsia kegeliana Mez
- Tillandsia kentii (H.Luther & K.F.Norton) Manzan. & W.Till
- Tillandsia kessleri H.Luther
- Tillandsia kickiae Raack, Manzan. & Gouda
- Tillandsia kirchhoffiana Wittmack
- Tillandsia kirschnekii Rauh & W. Till
- Tillandsia klausii Ehlers
- Tillandsia koehresiana Ehlers
- Tillandsia koideae Rauh & E. Gross
- Tillandsia kolbii W. Till & Schatzl
- Tillandsia krahnii Rauh
- Tillandsia kretzii Ehlers & Lautner
- Tillandsia krukoffiana L.B.Sm.
- Tillandsia kuntzeana Mez
- Tillandsia kuzmae Ehlers

== L ==
- Tillandsia lagunaensis Ehlers
- Tillandsia lajensis André
- Tillandsia lampropoda L.B.Sm.
- Tillandsia landbeckii Philippi
- Tillandsia langlasseana Mez
- Tillandsia latifolia Meyen
- Tillandsia laui Matuda
- Tillandsia lautneri Ehlers
- Tillandsia lechneri W.Till & Barfuss
- Tillandsia leiboldiana Schlecht.
- Tillandsia leonamiana E. Pereira
- Tillandsia lepidosepala L.B.Sm.
- Tillandsia leucolepis L.B.Sm.
- Tillandsia leucopetala Büneker, R.Pontes & Witeck
- Tillandsia limae L.B.Sm.
- Tillandsia limarum E. Pereira
- Tillandsia limbata Schlecht.
- Tillandsia linearis Vellozo
- Tillandsia lineatispica Mez
- Tillandsia lithophila L. Hromadnik
- Tillandsia loliacea Martius ex Schultes f.
- Tillandsia loma-blancae Ehlers & Lautner
- Tillandsia longifolia Baker
- Tillandsia longiscapa Leme & W.Till
- Tillandsia lopezii L.B.Sm.
- Tillandsia lorentziana Griseb.
- Tillandsia lotteae H. Hromadnik
- Tillandsia loxensis N.Jaram., Manzan. & A.M.Gut.
- Tillandsia loxichaensis Ehlers
- Tillandsia lucida E. Morren ex Baker
- Tillandsia lutheri (Manzan. & W.Till) J.R.Grant
- Tillandsia lydiae Ehlers
- Tillandsia lymanii Rauh

== M ==
- Tillandsia macbrideana L.B.Sm.
- Tillandsia macdougallii L.B.Sm.
- Tillandsia machupicchuensis Gouda & J.Ochoa
- Tillandsia macrochlamys Baker
- Tillandsia macrodactylon Mez
- Tillandsia maculata Ruiz & Pav.
- Tillandsia macvaughii Espejo & López-Ferrari
- Tillandsia magnispica Espejo & López-Ferr.
- Tillandsia magnusiana Wittmack
- Tillandsia makoyana Baker
- Tillandsia makrinii L. Hromadnik
- Tillandsia mallemontii Glaziou ex Mez
- Tillandsia malyi L. Hromadnik
- Tillandsia malzinei (É.Morren) Baker
- Tillandsia mantiqueirae Paixão-Souza, N.G.Silva & R.J.V.Alves
- Tillandsia manzanilloensis Gouda
- Tillandsia marabascoensis Ehlers & Lautner
- Tillandsia marcalaensis Rauh & E.Gross
- Tillandsia × marceloi H. Takizawa & P. Koide
- Tillandsia marconae W. Till & Vitek
- Tillandsia maritima Matuda
- Tillandsia markusii L. Hromadnik
- Tillandsia marnieri-lapostollei Rauh (also spelt Tillandsia marnieri-apostollei)
- Tillandsia mateoensis Ehlers
- Tillandsia matudae L.B.Sm.
- Tillandsia mauryana L.B.Sm.
- Tillandsia may-patii I. Ramírez & Carnevali
- Tillandsia maya I. Ramírez & Carnevali
- Tillandsia mazatlanensis Rauh
- Tillandsia mereliana Schinini
- Tillandsia micans L.B.Sm.
- Tillandsia milagrensis Leme
- Tillandsia mima L.B.Sm.
- Tillandsia minasgeraisensis Ehlers & W. Till.
- Tillandsia minutiflora Donadio
- Tillandsia mirabilis L. Hromadnik
- Tillandsia mitlaensis Weber & Ehlers
- Tillandsia mixtecorum Ehlers & Koide
- Tillandsia mollis H. Hromadnik & W. Till
- Tillandsia montana Reitz
- Tillandsia mooreana L.B.Sm.
- Tillandsia moronesensis Ehlers
- Tillandsia moscosoi L.B.Sm.
- Tillandsia muhriae W.Weber
- Tillandsia multicaulis Steudel
- Tillandsia myosura Griseb. ex Baker

== N ==
- Tillandsia nana Baker
- Tillandsia nayelyana R.García Mart. & Beutelsp.
- Tillandsia neglecta E. Pereira
- Tillandsia nervata L.B.Sm.
- Tillandsia nervisepala (Gilmartin) L.B.Sm.
- Tillandsia nicolasensis Ehlers
- Tillandsia × nidus Rauh & Lehmann
- Tillandsia nizandaensis Ehlers
- Tillandsia nolleriana Ehlers
- Tillandsia novakii H.Luther
- Tillandsia nuptialis R. Braga & Sucre
- Tillandsia nuyooensis Ehlers

== O ==
- Tillandsia oaxacana L.B.Sm.
- Tillandsia oblivata L. Hromadnik
- Tillandsia occulta H.Luther
- Tillandsia oerstediana L.B.Sm.
- Tillandsia oliveirae E.H.Souza & Leme
- Tillandsia orbicularis L.B.Sm.
- Tillandsia organensis Ehlers
- Tillandsia orogenes Standley & L.O. Williams
- Tillandsia oropezana L. Hromadnik
- Tillandsia oroyensis Mez
- Tillandsia ortgiesiana E. Morren ex Mez
- Tillandsia ovatispicata Gouda
- Tillandsia oxapampae Rauh & von Bismarck

== P ==
- Tillandsia pachyaxon L.B.Sm.
- Tillandsia pacifica Ehlers
- Tillandsia paleacea Presl
- Tillandsia pallescens Betancur & N. García
- Tillandsia pamelae Rauh
- Tillandsia pampasensis Rauh
- Tillandsia paniculata (L.) L.
- Tillandsia paraensis Mez
- Tillandsia paraibensis R.A.Pontes
- Tillandsia paraisoensis Ehlers
- Tillandsia pardoi Gouda
- Tillandsia parryi Baker
- Tillandsia parvispica Baker
- Tillandsia pastensis André
- Tillandsia paucifolia Baker
- Tillandsia pedicellata (Mez) Castellanos
- Tillandsia peiranoi Castellanos
- Tillandsia penascoensis Ehlers & Lautner
- Tillandsia pentasticha Rauh & Wülfinghoff
- Tillandsia pfeufferi Rauh
- Tillandsia pfisteri Rauh
- Tillandsia piauiensis Ehlers & J.Claus
- Tillandsia piepenbringii (Rauh) J.R.Grant
- Tillandsia pinicola I. Ramírez & Carnevali
- Tillandsia pinnatodigitata Mez
- Tillandsia piurensis L.B.Sm.
- Tillandsia plagiotropica Rohweder
- Tillandsia platyphylla Mez
- Tillandsia plumosa Baker
- Tillandsia pohliana Mez
- Tillandsia polita L.B.Sm.
- Tillandsia polyantha Mez & Sodiro
- Tillandsia polystachia (L.) L.
- Tillandsia polzii Ehlers
- Tillandsia pomacochae Rauh
- Tillandsia ponderosa L.B.Sm.
- Tillandsia porongoensis L. Hromadnik & P. Schneider
- Tillandsia portillae E. Gross & Wülfinghoff
- Tillandsia porvenirensis Ehlers
- Tillandsia praschekii Ehlers & Willinger
- Tillandsia pringlei S.Watson
- Tillandsia prodigiosa (Lemaire) Baker
- Tillandsia prolata (H.Luther) Gouda & Barfuss
- Tillandsia propagulifera Rauh
- Tillandsia pruinosa Swartz
- Tillandsia pseudobaileyi Gardner
- Tillandsia pseudocardenasii W.Weber
- Tillandsia pseudofloribunda Gouda
- Tillandsia pseudomacbrideana Rauh
- Tillandsia pseudomicans Rauh
- Tillandsia pseudomontana W.Weber & Ehlers
- Tillandsia pseudooaxacana Ehlers
- Tillandsia pseudosetacea Ehlers & Rauh
- Tillandsia pucaraensis Ehlers
- Tillandsia pueblensis L.B.Sm.
- Tillandsia punctulata Schlecht. & Chamisso
- Tillandsia purpurascens Rauh
- Tillandsia purpurea Ruiz & Pav.
- Tillandsia pyramidata André

== Q ==
- Tillandsia quaquaflorifera Matuda
- Tillandsia queretaroensis Ehlers
- Tillandsia queroensis Gilmartin

== R ==
- Tillandsia raackii H.Luther
- Tillandsia racinae L.B.Sm.
- Tillandsia ramellae W. Till & S. Till
- Tillandsia rangelensis Hechav.
- Tillandsia rariflora André
- Tillandsia rauhii L.B.Sm.
- Tillandsia rauschii Rauh & Lehmann
- Tillandsia reclinata E. Pereira & Martinelli
- Tillandsia rectangula Baker
- Tillandsia × rectifolia C.A. Wiley
- Tillandsia recurvata (L.) L.
- Tillandsia recurvifolia Hook.
- Tillandsia recurvispica L. Hromadnik & P. Schneider
- Tillandsia reducta L.B.Sm.
- Tillandsia reichenbachii Baker
- Tillandsia religiosa Hern.-Cárdenas et al.
- Tillandsia remota Wittmack
- Tillandsia renateae Gouda, Manzan. & Raack
- Tillandsia renateehlersiae Leme & Gouda
- Tillandsia restrepoana André
- Tillandsia retorta Griseb. ex Baker
- Tillandsia rettigiana Mez
- Tillandsia reuteri Rauh
- Tillandsia reversa L.B.Sm.
- Tillandsia rhodocephala Ehlers & Koide
- Tillandsia rhodosticta L.B.Sm.
- Tillandsia rhomboidea André
- Tillandsia riohondoensis Ehlers
- Tillandsia riverae Manzan. & W.Till
- Tillandsia rodrigueziana Mez
- Tillandsia roezlii E. Morren
- Tillandsia rohdenardinii Strehl
- Tillandsia roland-gosselinii Mez
- Tillandsia romeroi L.B.Sm.
- Tillandsia rosacea L. Hromadnik & W. Till
- Tillandsia rosarioae L. Hromadnik
- Tillandsia roseiflora Ehlers & W.Weber
- Tillandsia roseoscapa Matuda
- Tillandsia roseospicata Matuda
- Tillandsia rothii Rauh
- Tillandsia rotundata (L.B.Sm.) Gardner
- Tillandsia rubella Baker
- Tillandsia rubia Ehlers & L. Colgan
- Tillandsia rubrispica Ehlers & Koide
- Tillandsia rubroviolacea Rauh
- Tillandsia rudolfii E. Gross & Hase
- Tillandsia rusbyi Baker

== S ==
- Tillandsia sagasteguii L.B.Sm.
- Tillandsia salmonea Ehlers
- Tillandsia samaipatensis W. Till
- Tillandsia sangii Ehlers
- Tillandsia santiagoensis H.Hrom. & L.Hrom.
- Tillandsia santieusebii Morillo & Oliva-Esteva
- Tillandsia santosiae Ehlers
- Tillandsia sceptriformis Mez & Sodiro ex Mez
- Tillandsia schatzlii Rauh
- Tillandsia schiedeana Steudel
- Tillandsia schimperiana Wittmack
- Tillandsia schreiteri Lillo & A.Cast.
- Tillandsia schultzei Harms
- Tillandsia schusteri Rauh
- Tillandsia secunda Kunth
- Tillandsia seideliana E. Pereira
- Tillandsia seleriana Mez
- Tillandsia selleana Harms
- Tillandsia sessemocinoi Lopez-Ferrari, Espejo & P. Blanco
- Tillandsia setacea Swartz
- Tillandsia setiformis Ehlers
- Tillandsia sierrahalensis Espejo & López-Ferrari
- Tillandsia sierrajuarezensis Matuda
- Tillandsia sigmoidea L.B.Sm.
- Tillandsia simulata Small
- Tillandsia × smalliana H.Luther (T. balbisiana × T. fasciculata) – regarded as "unplaced" by Plants of the World Online
- Tillandsia socialis L.B.Sm.
- Tillandsia sodiroi Mez
- Tillandsia somnians L.B.Sm.
- Tillandsia spathacea Mez & Sodiro
- Tillandsia sphaerocephala Baker
- Tillandsia spiraliflora Rauh
- Tillandsia spiralipetala Gouda
- Tillandsia sprengeliana Klotzsch ex Mez
- Tillandsia standleyi L.B.Sm.
- Tillandsia steiropoda L.B.Sm.
- Tillandsia stellifera L. Hromadnik
- Tillandsia stenoura Harms
- Tillandsia stipitata L.B.Sm.
- Tillandsia stoltenii Ehlers & E.Gross
- Tillandsia straminea Kunth
- Tillandsia streptocarpa Baker
- Tillandsia streptophylla Scheidweiler ex E. Morren
- Tillandsia stricta Solander
- Tillandsia subconcolor L.B.Sm.
- Tillandsia subinflata L.B.Sm.
- Tillandsia subteres H.Luther
- Tillandsia subulifera Mez
- Tillandsia sucrei E. Pereira
- Tillandsia sueae Ehlers
- Tillandsia suescana L.B.Sm.
- Tillandsia suesilliae Espejo, López-Ferrari & W. Till
- Tillandsia superba Mez & Sodiro
- Tillandsia superinsignis Matuda
- Tillandsia supermexicana Matuda

== T ==
- Tillandsia tafiensis (L.B.Sm.) Gouda
- Tillandsia takizawae Ehlers & H.Luther
- Tillandsia taxcoensis Ehlers
- Tillandsia tecolometl Granados, Flores-Cruz & Salazar
- Tillandsia tecpanensis Ehlers & Lautner
- Tillandsia tectorum E. Morren
- Tillandsia tehuacana I. Ramírez & Carnevali
- Tillandsia teloloapanensis Ehlers & Lautner
- Tillandsia tenebra L. Hromadnik & W. Till
- Tillandsia tenuifolia L.
- Tillandsia teres L.B.Sm.
- Tillandsia thiekenii Ehlers
- Tillandsia thyrsigera E. Morren ex Baker
- Tillandsia tillii Ehlers
- Tillandsia tomekii L. Hromadnik
- Tillandsia tonalaensis Ehlers
- Tillandsia toropiensis Rauh
- Tillandsia tortilis Klotzsch ex Baker
- Tillandsia tovarensis Mez
- Tillandsia tragophoba Dillon
- Tillandsia trauneri L. Hromadnik
- Tillandsia trelawniensis Proctor
- Tillandsia tricholepis Baker
- Tillandsia tricolor Schlecht. & Chamisso
- Tillandsia trigalensis Ehlers
- Tillandsia truxillana L.B.Sm.
- Tillandsia turneri Baker
- Tillandsia turquinensis Willinger & Michlek

== U ==
- Tillandsia ulrici Ehlers
- Tillandsia ultima L.B.Sm.
- Tillandsia uruguayensis Rossado
- Tillandsia usneoides (L.) L.
- Tillandsia utriculata L.

== V ==
- Tillandsia × vandenbergii Ehlers & Hase
- Tillandsia variabilis Schlecht.
- Tillandsia velutina Ehlers
- Tillandsia ventanaensis Ehlers & Koide
- Tillandsia verapazana Ehlers
- Tillandsia vernicosa Baker
- Tillandsia vicentina Standley
- Tillandsia violacea Baker
- Tillandsia violaceiflora L.Hrom.
- Tillandsia violascens Mez
- Tillandsia virescens Ruiz & Pav.
- Tillandsia vriesioides Matuda

== W ==
- Tillandsia walter-richteri W.Weber
- Tillandsia walter-tillii J.R.Grant
- Tillandsia walteri Mez
- Tillandsia weberi L. Hromadnik & P. Schneider
- Tillandsia welzii Ehlers
- Tillandsia werdermannii Harms
- Tillandsia werner-rauhiana Koide & Takiz.
- Tillandsia werneriana J.R.Grant
- Tillandsia × wilinskii Gouda
- Tillandsia winkleri T.Strehl
- Tillandsia witeckii Büneker, R.Pontes & K.Soares
- Tillandsia wuelfinghoffii Ehlers
- Tillandsia wurdackii L.B.Sm.

== X ==
- Tillandsia xerographica Rohweder
- Tillandsia xiphioides Ker-Gawler

== Y ==
- Tillandsia yerba-santae Ehlers
- Tillandsia yuncharaensis W. Till
- Tillandsia yunckeri L.B.Sm.
- Tillandsia yutaninoensis Ehlers & Lautner

== Z ==
- Tillandsia zacapanensis Véliz & Feldhoff
- Tillandsia zacualpanensis Ehlers & Wülfinghoff
- Tillandsia zaragozaensis Ehlers
- Tillandsia zaratensis W.Weber
- Tillandsia zarumensis Gilmartin
- Tillandsia zecheri W. Till
- Tillandsia zoquensis Ehlers

== Former species ==
Species formerly placed in Tillandsia include:

- Billbergia amoena (Lodd. et al.) Lindl. (as T. amoena Lodd. et al.)
- Billbergia distachia (Vell.) Mez (as T. distachia Vell.)
- Catopsis berteroniana (Schult. & Schult.f.) Mez (as T. berteroniana Schult. & Schult.f.)
- Cipuropsis amicorum (I.Ramírez & Bevil.) Gouda (as T. amicorum I. Ramírez & Bevilacqua)
- Cryptanthus acaulis (Lindl.) Beer (as T. acaulis Lindl.)
- Deuterocohnia brevifolia (Griseb.) M.A.Spencer & L.B.Sm. (as T. chlorantha Speg.)
- Guzmania lingulata (L.) Mez (as T. lingulata L.)
- Guzmania musaica (Linden & André) Mez (as T. musaica Linden & André)
- Josemania asplundii (L.B.Sm.) W.Till & Barfuss (as T. asplundii L.B.Sm.)
- Josemania singularis (Mez & Wercklé) W.Till & Barfuss (as T. singularis Mez & Wercklé)
- Josemania truncata (L.B.Sm.) Christenh. & Byng (as T. truncata L.B.Sm.)
- Pseudalcantarea grandis (Schltdl.) Pinzón & Barfuss (as T. grandis Schlecht.)
- Pseudalcantarea viridiflora (Beer) Pinzón & Barfuss (as T. viridiflora (Beer) Baker)
- Racinaea dielsii (Harms) H.Luther (as T. dielsii Harms)
- Racinaea pallidoflavens (Mez) M.A.Spencer & L.B.Sm. (as T. pallidoflavens Mez)
- Racinaea pendulispica (Mez) M.A.Spencer & L.B.Sm. (as T. pendulispica Mez)
- Racinaea undulifolia (Mez) H.Luther (as T. undulifolia Mez)
- Vriesea ensiformis (Vell.) Beer (as T. ensiformis Vell.)
- Vriesea gigantea Gaudich. (as T. tessellata Linden)
- Vriesea myriantha (Baker) Betancur (as Tillandsia myriantha Baker)
- Vriesea psittacina (Hook.) Lindl. (as T. psittacina Hook.)
- Vriesea regina (Vell.) Beer (as T. regina Vell.)
- Vriesea splendens (Brongn.) Lem. (as T. splendens Brongn.)
- Werauhia insignis (Mez) W.Till, Barfuss & M.R.Samuel (as T. insignis (Mez) L.B.Sm. & Pittendr.)
