= Tillandsia velutina =

Scientific classification
- Kingdom: Plantae
- Clade: Tracheophytes
- Clade: Angiosperms
- Clade: Monocots
- Clade: Commelinids
- Order: Poales
- Family: Bromeliaceae
- Genus: Tillandsia
- Subgenus: Tillandsia subg. Tillandsia
- Species: T. velutina

Binomial name
- Tillandsia velutina Ehlers

Species of epiphyte

Tillandsia velutina is a species of flowering plant in the genus Tillandsia. This species is native to Chiapas and Guatemala.

== Cultivars ==
- Tillandsia 'Royale'
