= Tillandsia rohdenardinii =

Scientific classification
- Kingdom: Plantae
- Clade: Tracheophytes
- Clade: Angiosperms
- Clade: Monocots
- Clade: Commelinids
- Order: Poales
- Family: Bromeliaceae
- Genus: Tillandsia
- Subgenus: Tillandsia subg. Anoplophytum
- Species: T. rohdenardinii

Binomial name
- Tillandsia rohdenardinii Strehl

Species of plant

Tillandsia rohdenardinii is a species of flowering plant in the family Bromeliaceae, native to south Brazil (Rio Grande do Sul). It was first described by Teresia Strehl in 2004.

Tillandsia rohdenardinii is a species in the genus Tillandsia. This species is native to Brazil. As of October 2022, the Encyclopedia of Bromeliads regarded it as a synonym of Tillandsia winkleri, which it placed in subgenus Anoplophytum.
