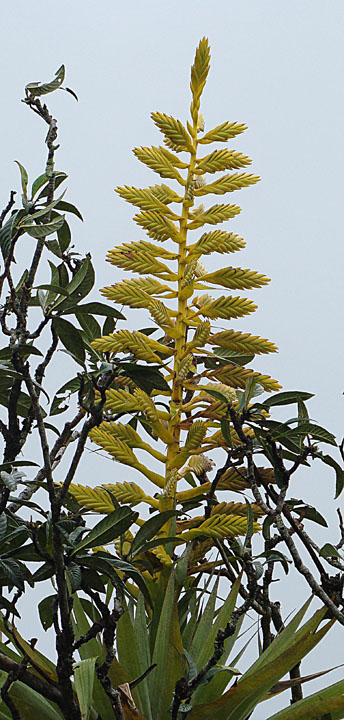

Scientific classification
- Kingdom: Plantae
- Clade: Tracheophytes
- Clade: Angiosperms
- Clade: Monocots
- Clade: Commelinids
- Order: Poales
- Family: Bromeliaceae
- Genus: Tillandsia
- Subgenus: Tillandsia subg. Tillandsia
- Species: T. oerstediana

Binomial name
- Tillandsia oerstediana L.B.Sm.

Synonyms
- List: Tillandsia deppeana var. costaricensis (Mez) L.B.Sm.; Tillandsia paniculata var. costaricensis Mez; Tillandsia rubra var. costaricensis (Mez) Mez

= Tillandsia oerstediana =

Species of plant

Tillandsia oerstediana is a species of flowering plant in the bromeliad family Bromeliaceae. It is an epiphyte that is found on open forested slopes in wet tropical areas. Tillandsia oerstediana is native to Costa Rica and western Panama.

== Description ==
Tillandsia oerstediana is an evergreen plant with grey-green leaves arranged in a rosette up to 40 cm across. When in bloom, it has a golden coloured flowerspike of waxy yellow bracts with tiny, tubular pink flowers.
