= Tillandsia elongata =

Scientific classification
- Kingdom: Plantae
- Clade: Tracheophytes
- Clade: Angiosperms
- Clade: Monocots
- Clade: Commelinids
- Order: Poales
- Family: Bromeliaceae
- Genus: Tillandsia
- Subgenus: Tillandsia subg. Tillandsia
- Species: T. elongata

Binomial name
- Tillandsia elongata Kunth

Species of epiphyte

Tillandsia elongata is a species of flowering plant in the genus Tillandsia. It is native to Central America, Yucatán, Jamaica, Trinidad, and northern South America (Colombia, Venezuela including the Venezuelan Antilles, Guyana, northern Brazil).
