= Tillandsia rusbyi =

Scientific classification
- Kingdom: Plantae
- Clade: Tracheophytes
- Clade: Angiosperms
- Clade: Monocots
- Clade: Commelinids
- Order: Poales
- Family: Bromeliaceae
- Genus: Tillandsia
- Subgenus: Tillandsia subg. Tillandsia
- Species: T. rusbyi

Binomial name
- Tillandsia rusbyi Baker

Synonyms
- Tillandsia buchtienii H.J.P.Winkl. Tillandsia glumaciflora Ule; Tillandsia guentheri Harms; Tillandsia ulei Mez

Species of plant

Tillandsia rusbyi is a species of flowering plant in the family Bromeliaceae. This species is native to Bolivia.
