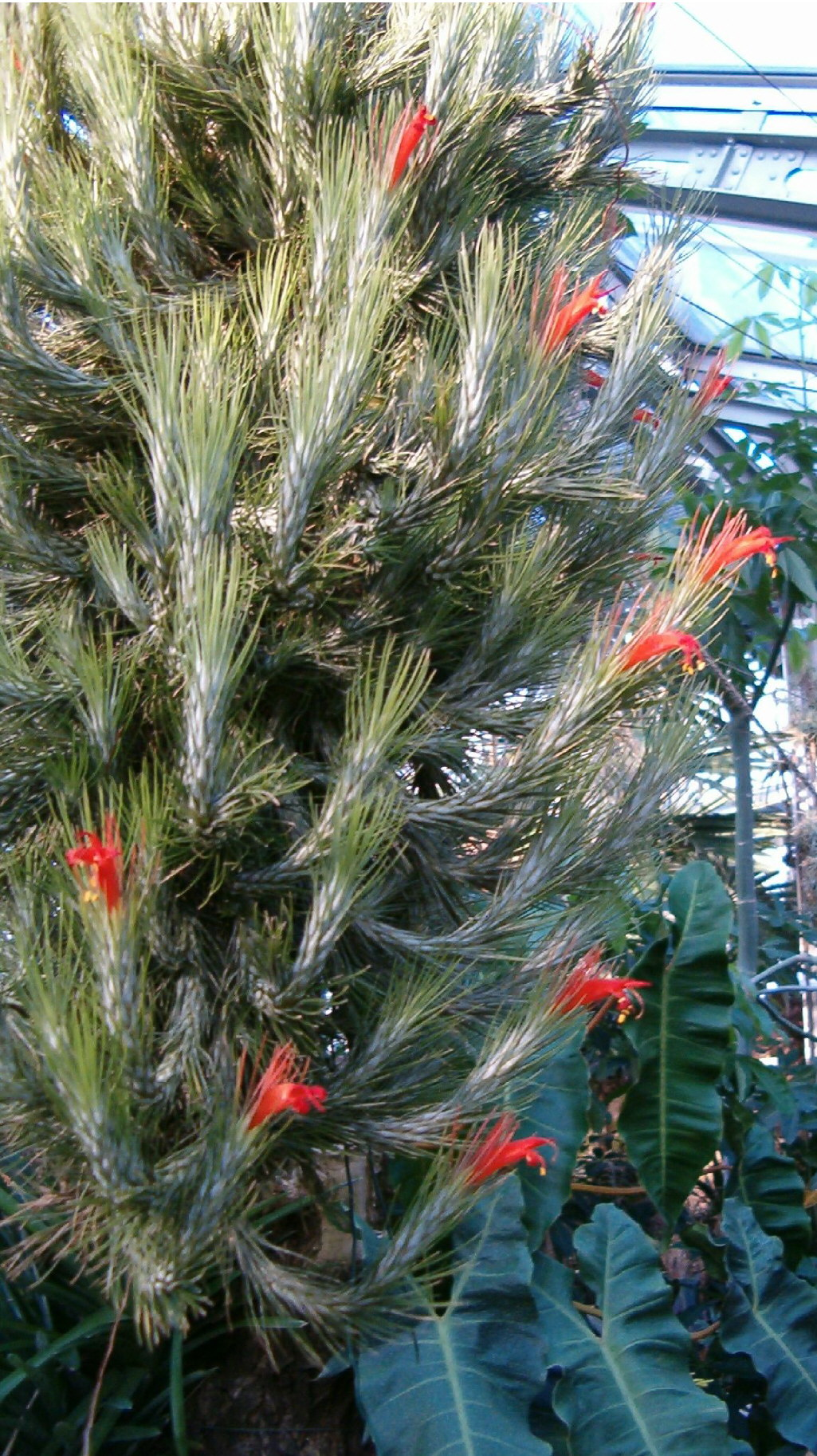

Scientific classification
- Kingdom: Plantae
- Clade: Tracheophytes
- Clade: Angiosperms
- Clade: Monocots
- Clade: Commelinids
- Order: Poales
- Family: Bromeliaceae
- Genus: Tillandsia
- Subgenus: Tillandsia subg. Tillandsia
- Species: T. andreana

Binomial name
- Tillandsia andreana É.Morren ex André

Synonyms
- Tillandsia funckiana Baker

= Tillandsia andreana =

Species of plant

Tillandsia andreana is a species of flowering plant in the family Bromeliaceae, native to Colombia and north-west Venezuela. It was first described in 1888.

Tillandsia funckiana is currently considered a synonym of T. andreana by authorities such as Kew, however, it has been argued by Werner Rauh and others that substantial differences between the two taxa mean they should be considered separate species, with T. andreana restricted to Colombia, and T. funckiana to Venezuela.
