= Tillandsia abbreviata =

Scientific classification
- Kingdom: Plantae
- Clade: Tracheophytes
- Clade: Angiosperms
- Clade: Monocots
- Clade: Commelinids
- Order: Poales
- Family: Bromeliaceae
- Genus: Tillandsia
- Subgenus: Tillandsia subg. Tillandsia
- Species: T. abbreviata

Binomial name
- Tillandsia abbreviata H.Luther

Species of epiphyte

Tillandsia abbreviata is a species in the genus Tillandsia. This species is native to Colombia.
