= Tillandsia longifolia =

Scientific classification
- Kingdom: Plantae
- Clade: Tracheophytes
- Clade: Angiosperms
- Clade: Monocots
- Clade: Commelinids
- Order: Poales
- Family: Bromeliaceae
- Genus: Tillandsia
- Subgenus: Tillandsia subg. Tillandsia
- Species: T. longifolia

Binomial name
- Tillandsia longifolia Baker

Species of plant

Tillandsia longifolia is a species of flowering plant in the genus Tillandsia. This species is native to Bolivia, Colombia, Peru, Panama, Costa Rica and Venezuela.
