= Tillandsia compressa =

Scientific classification
- Kingdom: Plantae
- Clade: Tracheophytes
- Clade: Angiosperms
- Clade: Monocots
- Clade: Commelinids
- Order: Poales
- Family: Bromeliaceae
- Genus: Tillandsia
- Species: T. compressa

Binomial name
- Tillandsia compressa Bertero ex Schult. & Schult.f.

Synonyms
- Anoplophytum setaceum Beer; Platystachys setacea Beer; Tillandsia fasciculata var. venosispica Mez; Tillandsia buchii Urb.; Tillandsia jaliscomonticola Matuda

Species of flowering plant

Tillandsia compressa is a species in the genus Tillandsia. This species is native to Mexico, Colombia, Central America, and the West Indies.

== Cultivars ==
- Tillandsia 'Casallena'
- Tillandsia 'Cathcart'
