= Tillandsia portillae =

Conservation status
- Endangered (IUCN 3.1)

Scientific classification
- Kingdom: Plantae
- Clade: Tracheophytes
- Clade: Angiosperms
- Clade: Monocots
- Clade: Commelinids
- Order: Poales
- Family: Bromeliaceae
- Genus: Tillandsia
- Species: T. portillae

Binomial name
- Tillandsia portillae E.Gross & Wülfingh.

Species of plant

Tillandsia portillae is a species of flowering plant in the family Bromeliaceae, endemic to Ecuador. It was first described in 1997. Its natural habitat is subtropical or tropical moist montane forests. It is threatened by habitat loss.
