= Tillandsia dura =

Scientific classification
- Kingdom: Plantae
- Clade: Tracheophytes
- Clade: Angiosperms
- Clade: Monocots
- Clade: Commelinids
- Order: Poales
- Family: Bromeliaceae
- Genus: Tillandsia
- Subgenus: Tillandsia subg. Tillandsia
- Species: T. dura

Binomial name
- Tillandsia dura Baker

Species of plant

Tillandsia dura is a species of flowering plant in the Bromeliaceae family. Tillandsia dura grows into a group of plants with a whorled leaf form. This species is endemic to Brazil.
