= Tillandsia lampropoda =

Scientific classification
- Kingdom: Plantae
- Clade: Tracheophytes
- Clade: Angiosperms
- Clade: Monocots
- Clade: Commelinids
- Order: Poales
- Family: Bromeliaceae
- Genus: Tillandsia
- Subgenus: Tillandsia subg. Tillandsia
- Species: T. lampropoda

Binomial name
- Tillandsia lampropoda L.B.Sm.

Synonyms
- Tillandsia lampropoda var. major L.B.Sm.

Species of plant

Tillandsia lampropoda is a species of flowering plant in the genus Tillandsia. This species is native to Central America and southern Mexico, from Oaxaca to Panama.

== Cultivars ==
- Tillandsia 'El Primo'
- Tillandsia 'Sentry'
- × Vrieslandsia 'Red Beacon'
