= Tillandsia hubertiana =

Scientific classification
- Kingdom: Plantae
- Clade: Tracheophytes
- Clade: Angiosperms
- Clade: Monocots
- Clade: Commelinids
- Order: Poales
- Family: Bromeliaceae
- Genus: Tillandsia
- Species: T. hubertiana

Binomial name
- Tillandsia hubertiana Matuda

Species of flowering plant

Tillandsia hubertiana is a species in the genus Tillandsia. This species is endemic to Mexico.
