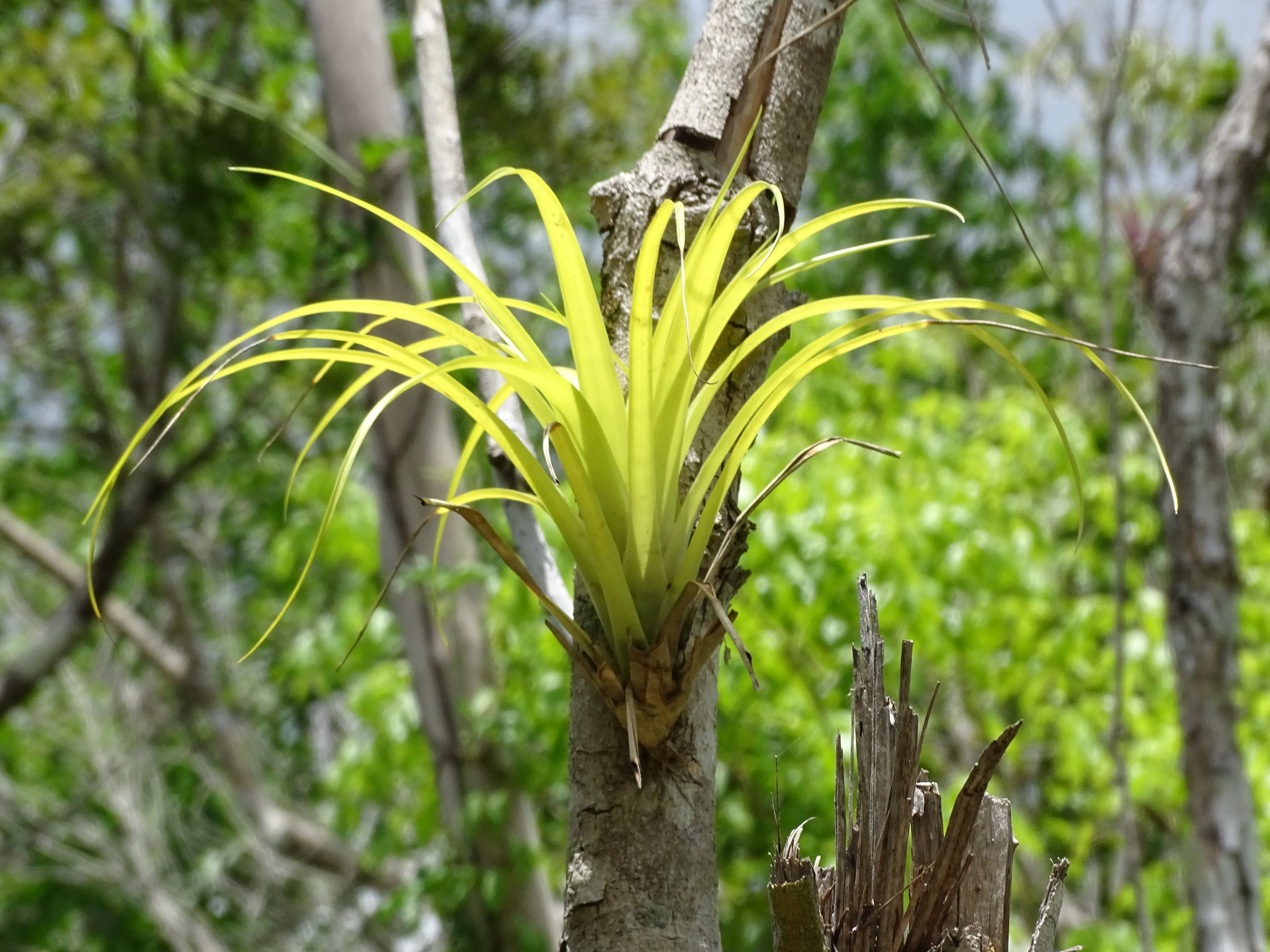
- In Mexico

Scientific classification
- Kingdom: Plantae
- Clade: Tracheophytes
- Clade: Angiosperms
- Clade: Monocots
- Clade: Commelinids
- Order: Poales
- Family: Bromeliaceae
- Genus: Tillandsia
- Subgenus: Tillandsia subg. Tillandsia
- Species: T. dasyliriifolia

Binomial name
- Tillandsia dasyliriifolia Baker

= Tillandsia dasyliriifolia =

Species of plant

Tillandsia dasyliriifolia is a species of flowering plant in the Bromeliaceae family. This species is native to eastern and southern Mexico (from Chiapas north to San Luis Potosí), Belize, and Isla de Providencia (an island in the Caribbean east of Nicaragua, governed by Colombia).
