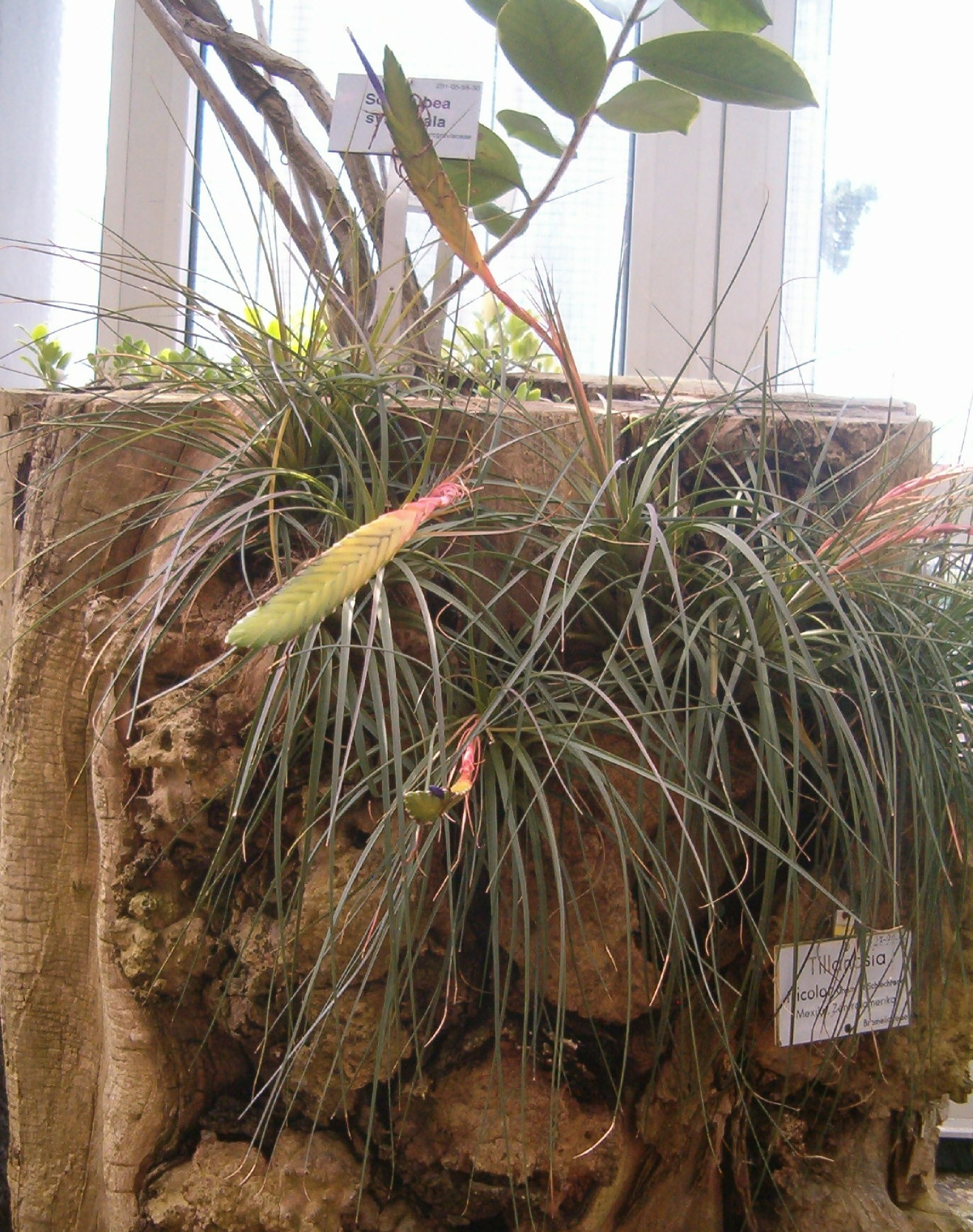

Scientific classification
- Kingdom: Plantae
- Clade: Tracheophytes
- Clade: Angiosperms
- Clade: Monocots
- Clade: Commelinids
- Order: Poales
- Family: Bromeliaceae
- Genus: Tillandsia
- Subgenus: Tillandsia subg. Tillandsia
- Species: T. tricolor

Binomial name
- Tillandsia tricolor Schltdl. & Cham.

Synonyms
- Vriesea xiphostachys Hook.; Tillandsia acroleuca Mez & Purpus; Tillandsia melanocrater L.B.Sm.; Tillandsia tricolor var. picta L.B.Sm.; Tillandsia tricolor var. melanocrater (L.B.Sm.) L.B.Sm.

= Tillandsia tricolor =

Species of epiphyte

Tillandsia tricolor is a species of flowering plant in the genus Tillandsia. This species is native to Central America (Costa Rica, Panama, Guatemala, Nicaragua, Honduras) and Mexico (Veracruz, Oaxaca, Chiapas).

== Cultivars ==
- Tillandsia 'Cootharaba'
- Tillandsia 'Corella'
- Tillandsia 'Ervin Wurthmann'
- Tillandsia 'Nashville'
- Tillandsia 'Oeseriana'
- Tillandsia 'Purple Passion'
- Tillandsia 'Silver Bullets'
- Tillandsia 'Wolvi'
