= Tillandsia elizabethae =

Scientific classification
- Kingdom: Plantae
- Clade: Tracheophytes
- Clade: Angiosperms
- Clade: Monocots
- Clade: Commelinids
- Order: Poales
- Family: Bromeliaceae
- Genus: Tillandsia
- Subgenus: Tillandsia subg. Tillandsia
- Species: T. elizabethae

Binomial name
- Tillandsia elizabethae Rauh

Synonyms
- T. sonorensis L. B. Smith & M. A. Dimmitt

Species of plant

Tillandsia elizabethae is a species in the genus Tillandsia. This species is endemic to Mexico.
