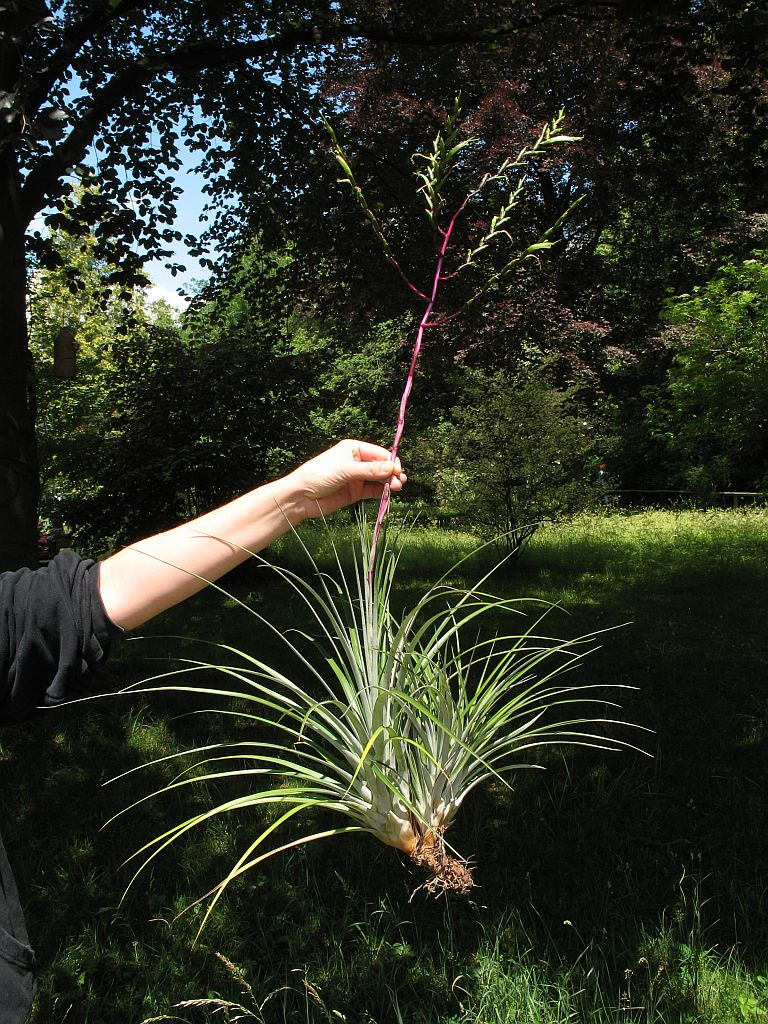

Scientific classification
- Kingdom: Plantae
- Clade: Tracheophytes
- Clade: Angiosperms
- Clade: Monocots
- Clade: Commelinids
- Order: Poales
- Family: Bromeliaceae
- Genus: Tillandsia
- Subgenus: Tillandsia subg. Tillandsia
- Species: T. limbata

Binomial name
- Tillandsia limbata Schltdl.

= Tillandsia limbata =

Species of plant

Tillandsia limbata is a plant species in the genus Tillandsia. This species is endemic to Mexico.

== Cultivars ==
- Tillandsia 'Durrell'
- Tillandsia 'Gusher'
