= Tillandsia rothii =

Scientific classification
- Kingdom: Plantae
- Clade: Tracheophytes
- Clade: Angiosperms
- Clade: Monocots
- Clade: Commelinids
- Order: Poales
- Family: Bromeliaceae
- Genus: Tillandsia
- Subgenus: Tillandsia subg. Tillandsia
- Species: T. rothii

Binomial name
- Tillandsia rothii Rauh

Synonyms
- Tillandsia lambrostachya Philcox & Psomad.

Species of plant

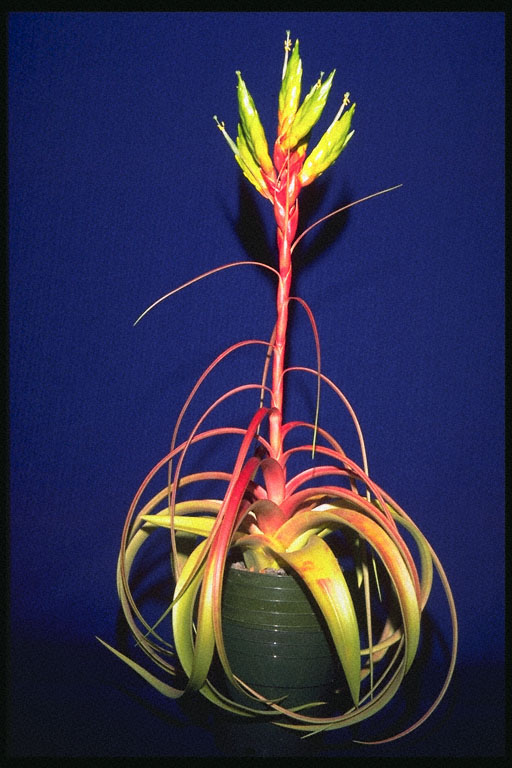
Picture of Tillandsia rothii in bloom

Tillandsia rothii is an epiphytic bromeliad native to Mexico. It was first described by Werner Rauh in 1976. It can grow quite large and colorful.

== Cultivars ==
- Tillandsia 'Amigo'
- Tillandsia 'Bahia'
- Tillandsia 'Pacific Sunset'
