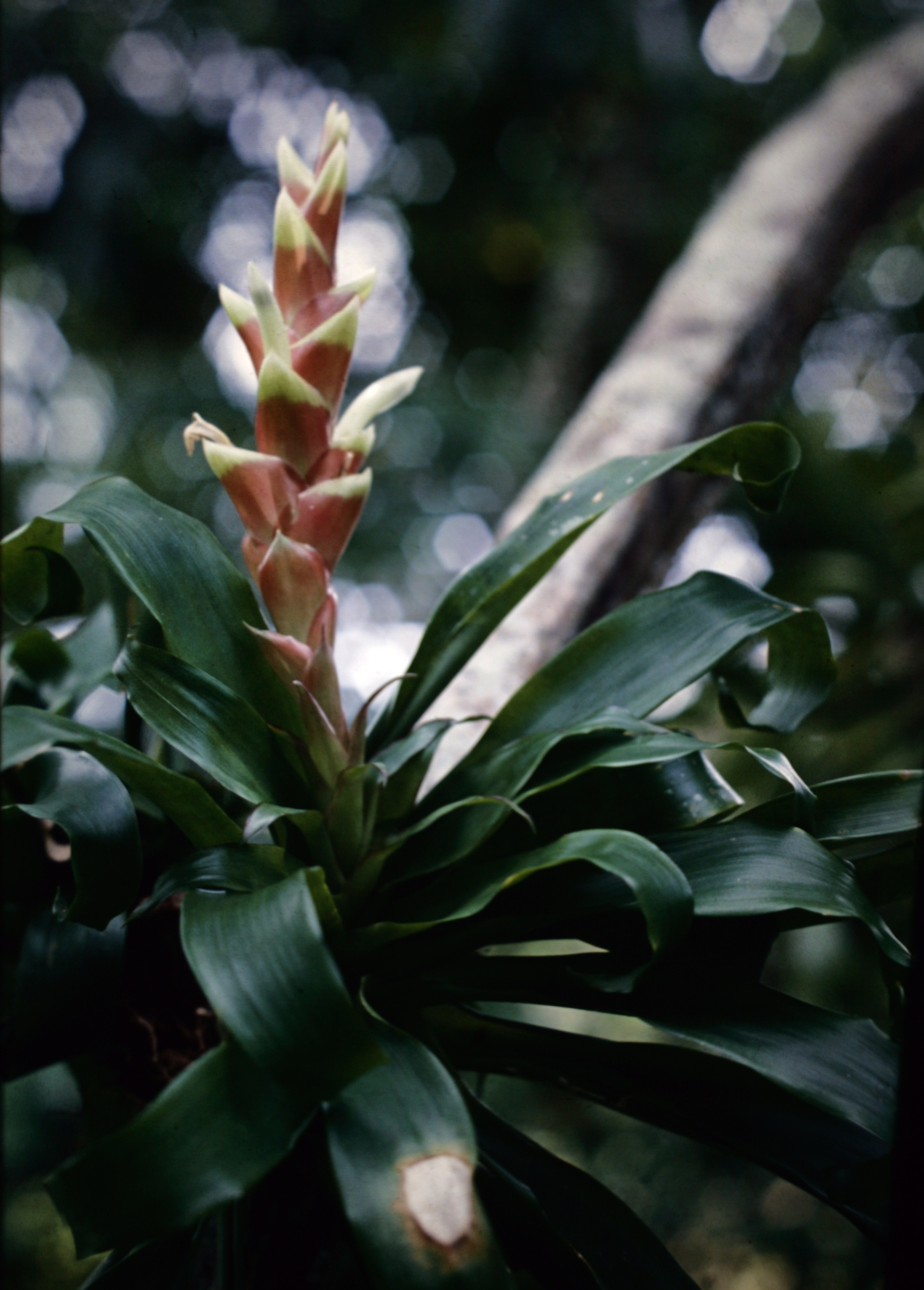

Conservation status
- Least Concern (IUCN 3.1)

Scientific classification
- Kingdom: Plantae
- Clade: Tracheophytes
- Clade: Angiosperms
- Clade: Monocots
- Clade: Commelinids
- Order: Poales
- Family: Bromeliaceae
- Genus: Tillandsia
- Subgenus: Tillandsia subg. Tillandsia
- Species: T. heliconioides

Binomial name
- Tillandsia heliconioides Kunth

Synonyms
- Guzmania obtusa Rusby; Vriesea bellula Linden; Vriesea bullata C.Chev.; Vriesea falkenbergii W.Bull; Vriesea heliconioides (Kunth) Hook. ex Walp.

= Tillandsia heliconioides =

Species of flowering plant

Tillandsia heliconioides is a plant species in the genus Tillandsia. This species is native to Mexico, Central America (Belize, Costa Rica, Guatemala, Honduras, Nicaragua and Panama) and South America (Bolivia, Brazil, Colombia, Ecuador, French Guiana, Guyana, Peru, Suriname, and Venezuela).
