= Tillandsia lutheri =

Conservation status
- Vulnerable (IUCN 3.1)

Scientific classification
- Kingdom: Plantae
- Clade: Tracheophytes
- Clade: Angiosperms
- Clade: Monocots
- Clade: Commelinids
- Order: Poales
- Family: Bromeliaceae
- Genus: Tillandsia
- Species: T. lutheri

Binomial name
- Tillandsia lutheri (Manzan. & W.Till) J.R.Grant

Synonyms

Species of flowering plant

Tillandsia lutheri is a species of flowering plant in the family Bromeliaceae, endemic to Ecuador. It was first described in 2000 as Vriesea lutheri. Its natural habitat is subtropical or tropical moist montane forests.
