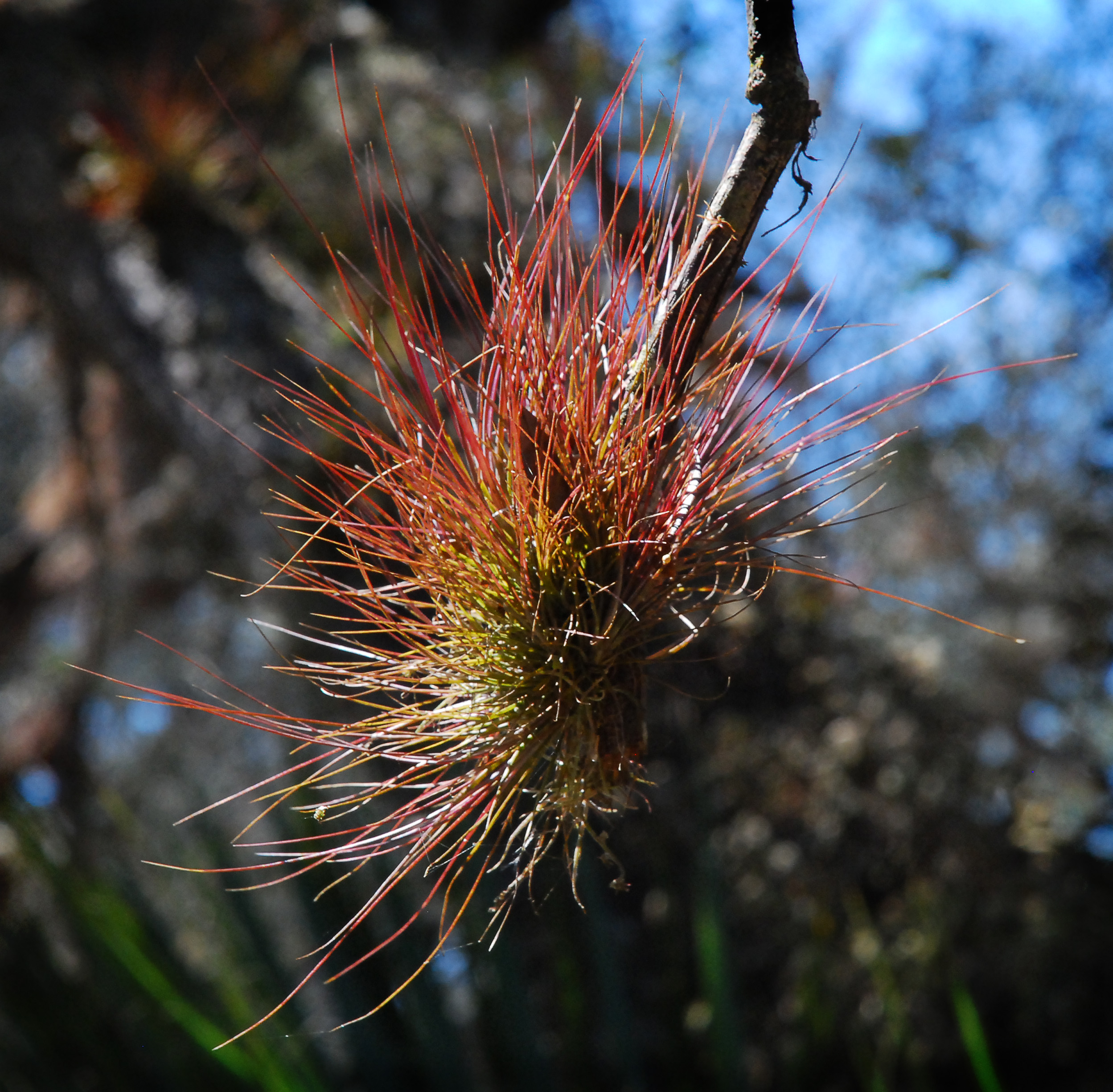

Scientific classification
- Kingdom: Plantae
- Clade: Tracheophytes
- Clade: Angiosperms
- Clade: Monocots
- Clade: Commelinids
- Order: Poales
- Family: Bromeliaceae
- Genus: Tillandsia
- Subgenus: Tillandsia subg. Tillandsia
- Species: T. setacea

Binomial name
- Tillandsia setacea Swartz

Synonyms
- Renealmia disticha L.; Tillandsia calamifolia Salisb.; Tillandsia caespitosa Leconte; Tillandsia disticha (L.) Willd. ex Schult. & Schult.f. 1830, illegitimate homonym, not Kunth 1816; Diaphoranthema versicolor Beer; Platystachys disticha (L.) Beer; Vriesea disticha (L.) Kuntze; Tillandsia bromoides Mez

= Tillandsia setacea =

Species of plant

Tillandsia setacea, the southern needleleaf, is a species of flowering plant in the genus Tillandsia. It has a scattered, disjunct distribution in the southeastern United States (Florida, Georgia), northwestern and southern Mexico (Jalisco, Sinaloa, Nayarit, Chiapas, Oaxaca, Campeche), Guatemala, the West Indies (Cayman Islands, Cuba, Hispaniola, Jamaica, Puerto Rico) and the State of Pará in northeastern Brazil.

== Cultivars ==
- Tillandsia 'But'
