= Tillandsia hammeri =

Scientific classification
- Kingdom: Plantae
- Clade: Tracheophytes
- Clade: Angiosperms
- Clade: Monocots
- Clade: Commelinids
- Order: Poales
- Family: Bromeliaceae
- Genus: Tillandsia
- Subgenus: Tillandsia subg. Tillandsia
- Species: T. hammeri

Binomial name
- Tillandsia hammeri Rauh & Ehlers

Species of plant

Tillandsia hammeri is a species of flowering plant in the genus Tillandsia. This species is endemic to Mexico.

It is named after the renowned botanist and plantsman, active in Mexico in the late 20th and early 21st century, Gary Hammer.
