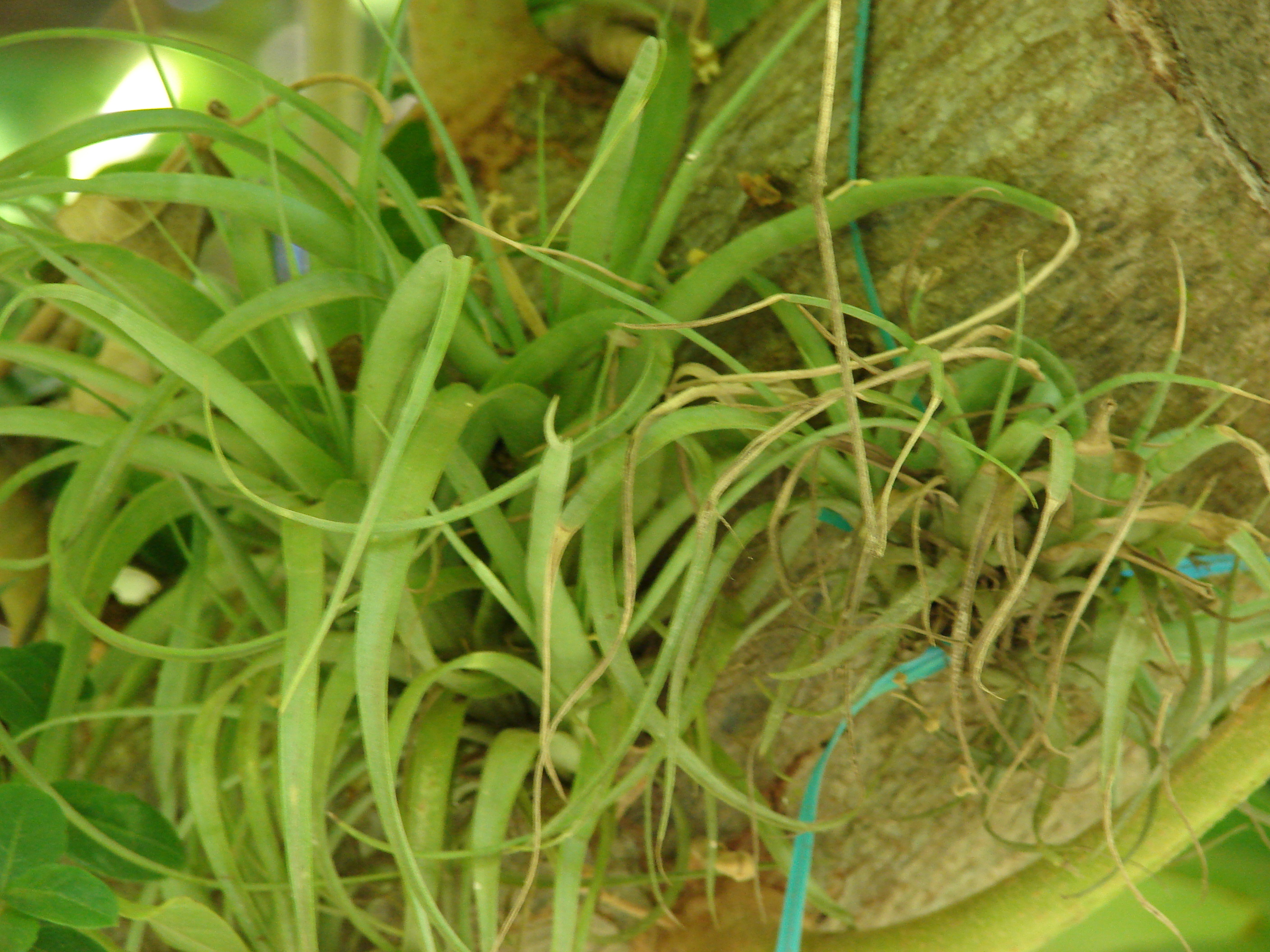

Scientific classification
- Kingdom: Plantae
- Clade: Tracheophytes
- Clade: Angiosperms
- Clade: Monocots
- Clade: Commelinids
- Order: Poales
- Family: Bromeliaceae
- Genus: Tillandsia
- Subgenus: Tillandsia subg. Tillandsia
- Species: T. polystachia

Binomial name
- Tillandsia polystachia (L.) L.

Synonyms
- Renealmia polystachia L.; Platystachys polystachia (L.) Beer; Tillandsia angustifolia Sw.

= Tillandsia polystachia =

Species of flowering plant

Tillandsia polystachia is a species of flowering plant in the genus Tillandsia. This species is native to Central America, the West Indies (Greater Antilles, Lesser Antilles, Bahamas), Bolivia, Colombia, Brazil, Ecuador, Mexico and Venezuela.

== Cultivars ==
- Tillandsia 'Gusher'
- Tillandsia 'Polly Ellen'
