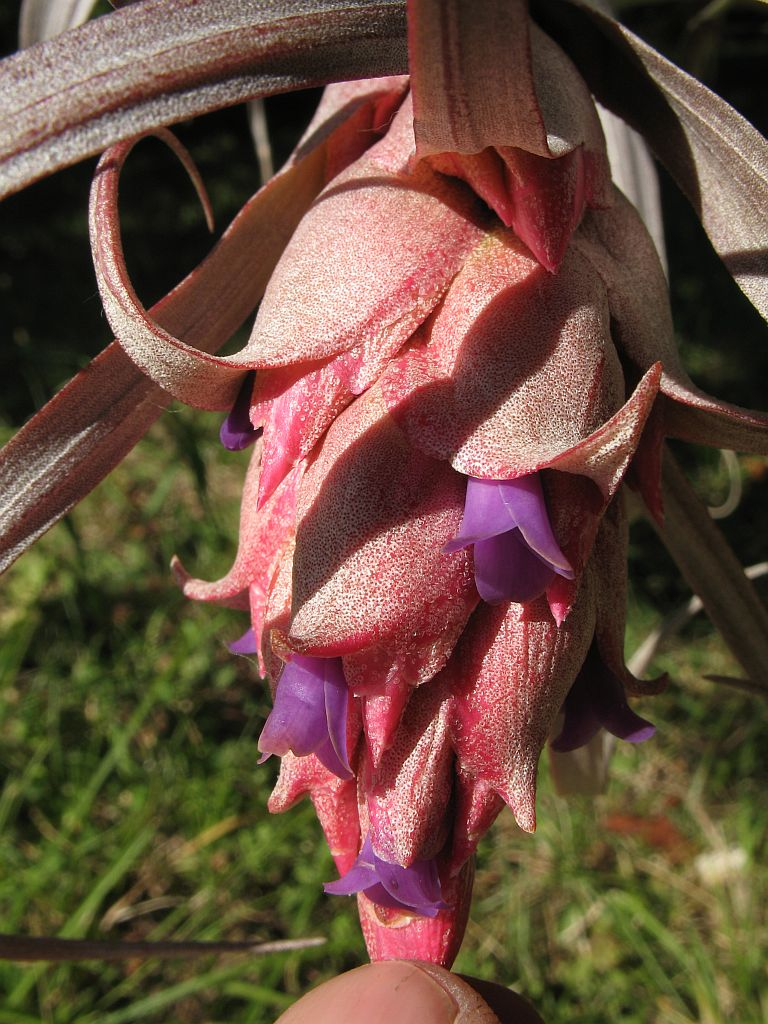

Scientific classification
- Kingdom: Plantae
- Clade: Tracheophytes
- Clade: Angiosperms
- Clade: Monocots
- Clade: Commelinids
- Order: Poales
- Family: Bromeliaceae
- Genus: Tillandsia
- Subgenus: Tillandsia subg. Tillandsia
- Species: T. sphaerocephala

Binomial name
- Tillandsia sphaerocephala Baker

= Tillandsia sphaerocephala =

Species of plant

Tillandsia sphaerocephala is a species of flowering plant in the family Bromeliaceae. This species is native to Bolivia.
