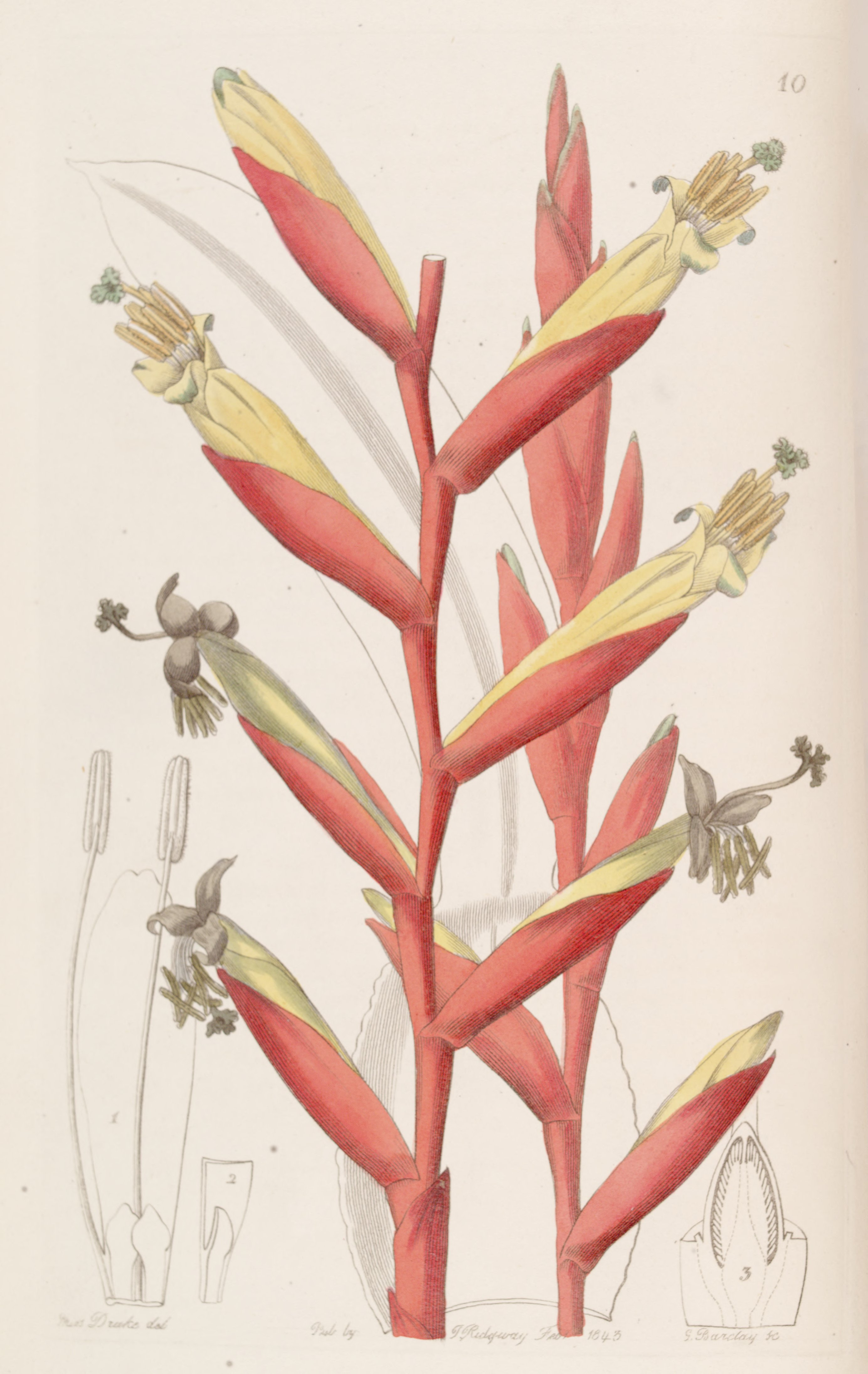

Scientific classification
- Kingdom: Plantae
- Clade: Tracheophytes
- Clade: Angiosperms
- Clade: Monocots
- Clade: Commelinids
- Order: Poales
- Family: Bromeliaceae
- Genus: Vriesea
- Species: V. psittacina

Binomial name
- Vriesea psittacina (Hooker) Lindley

= Vriesea psittacina =

Species of flowering plant

Vriesea psittacina is a plant species in the genus Vriesea. This species is native to Brazil.

== Cultivars ==
- Vriesea 'Andreana'
- Vriesea 'Antonia'
- Vriesea 'Aurora Major'
- Vriesea 'Baron de Selys'
- Vriesea 'Cavalier'
- Vriesea 'Coral'
- Vriesea 'Don Gallii'
- Vriesea 'Dufricheana'
- Vriesea 'Four Moons of Jupiter'
- Vriesea 'Gracilis'
- Vriesea 'Heinrich Schmidt'
- Vriesea 'Kienastii'
- Vriesea 'Leverett's Delight'
- Vriesea 'Medaille d'Argent'
- Vriesea 'Morreniana'
- Vriesea 'Psittacino-Fulgida'
- Vriesea 'Psittacino-Splendens'
- Vriesea 'Souvenir de Joseph Mawet'
- Vriesea 'Wiotiana'
