= Tillandsia × nidus =

Scientific classification
- Kingdom: Plantae
- Clade: Tracheophytes
- Clade: Angiosperms
- Clade: Monocots
- Clade: Commelinids
- Order: Poales
- Family: Bromeliaceae
- Genus: Tillandsia
- Species: T. × nidus

Binomial name
- Tillandsia × nidus Rauh & Lehmann

Tillandsia × nidus is a natural hybrid (T. fasciculata × T. ionantha) of the genus Tillandsia. This plant is endemic to Mexico.
