= Tillandsia exserta =

Scientific classification
- Kingdom: Plantae
- Clade: Tracheophytes
- Clade: Angiosperms
- Clade: Monocots
- Clade: Commelinids
- Order: Poales
- Family: Bromeliaceae
- Genus: Tillandsia
- Subgenus: Tillandsia subg. Tillandsia
- Species: T. exserta

Binomial name
- Tillandsia exserta Fernald

Species of plant

Tillandsia exserta is a species in the genus Tillandsia. This species is endemic to Mexico.

== Cultivars ==
- Tillandsia 'Boreen'
- Tillandsia 'Brooyar'
- Tillandsia 'Cootharaba'
- Tillandsia 'Heather's Blush'
