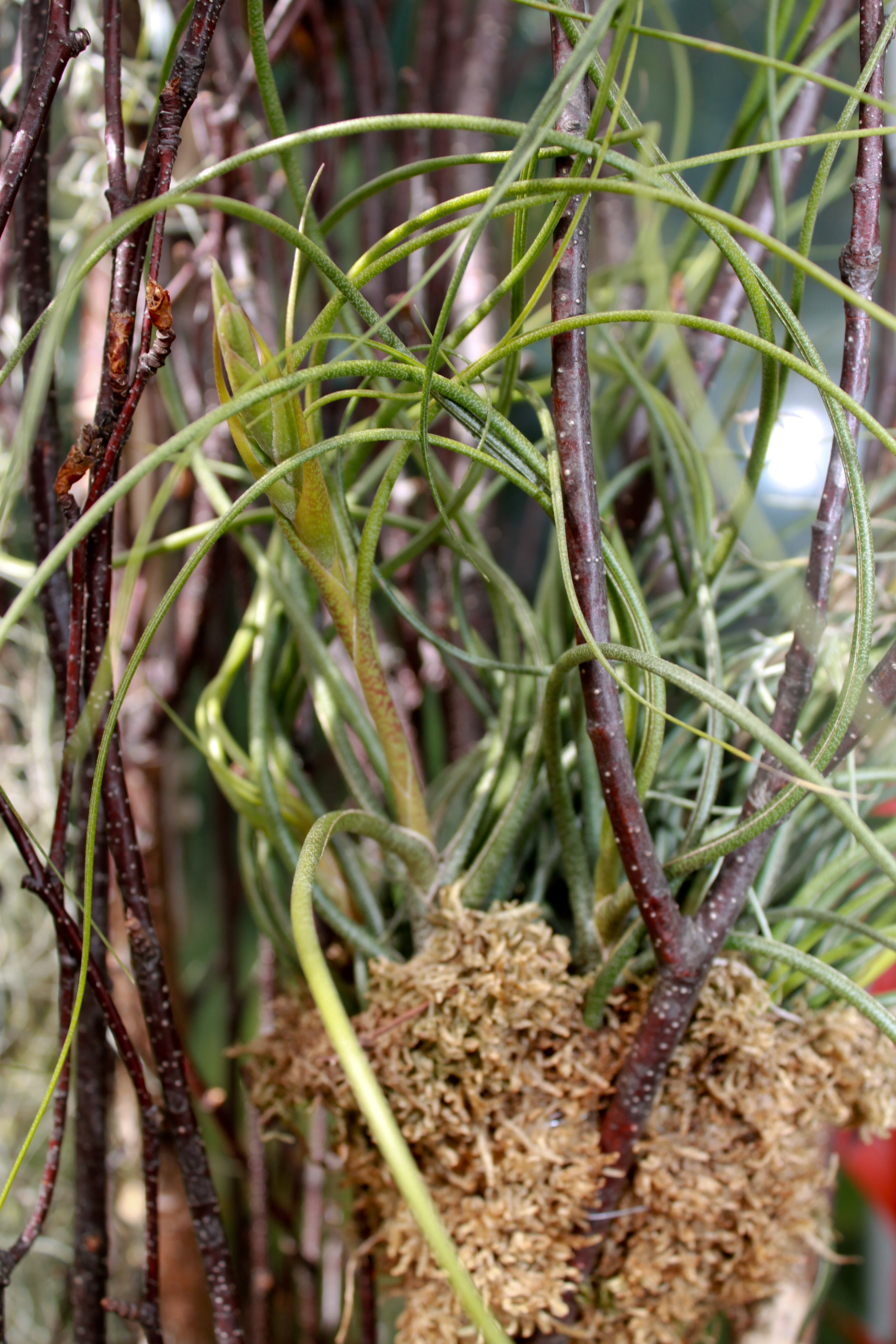

Scientific classification
- Kingdom: Plantae
- Clade: Embryophytes
- Clade: Tracheophytes
- Clade: Spermatophytes
- Clade: Angiosperms
- Clade: Monocots
- Clade: Commelinids
- Order: Poales
- Family: Bromeliaceae
- Genus: Tillandsia
- Subgenus: Tillandsia subg. Tillandsia
- Species: T. butzii

Binomial name
- Tillandsia butzii Mez

Synonyms
- Homotypic Synonyms: Tillandsia variegata Schltdl.; Heterotypic Synonyms: Platystachys inanis (Lindl. & Paxton) Beer; Tillandsia butzii var. roseiflora Ehlers; Tillandsia inanis Lindl. & Paxton

= Tillandsia butzii =

Species of plant

Tillandsia butzii is a species of flowering plant in the family Bromeliaceae. This species is native to Costa Rica and Mexico.

== Taxonomy ==
=== Cultivars ===
Recognized cultivars include:

- Tillandsia 'Kacey'
- Tillandsia 'Kinkin'
