= Tillandsia gymnobotrya =

Scientific classification
- Kingdom: Plantae
- Clade: Tracheophytes
- Clade: Angiosperms
- Clade: Monocots
- Clade: Commelinids
- Order: Poales
- Family: Bromeliaceae
- Genus: Tillandsia
- Subgenus: Tillandsia subg. Tillandsia
- Species: T. gymnobotrya

Binomial name
- Tillandsia gymnobotrya Baker

Synonyms
- Tillandsia purpusii Mez

Species of plant

Tillandsia gymnobotrya is a species of flowering plant in the Bromeliaceae family. This species is endemic to Mexico.
