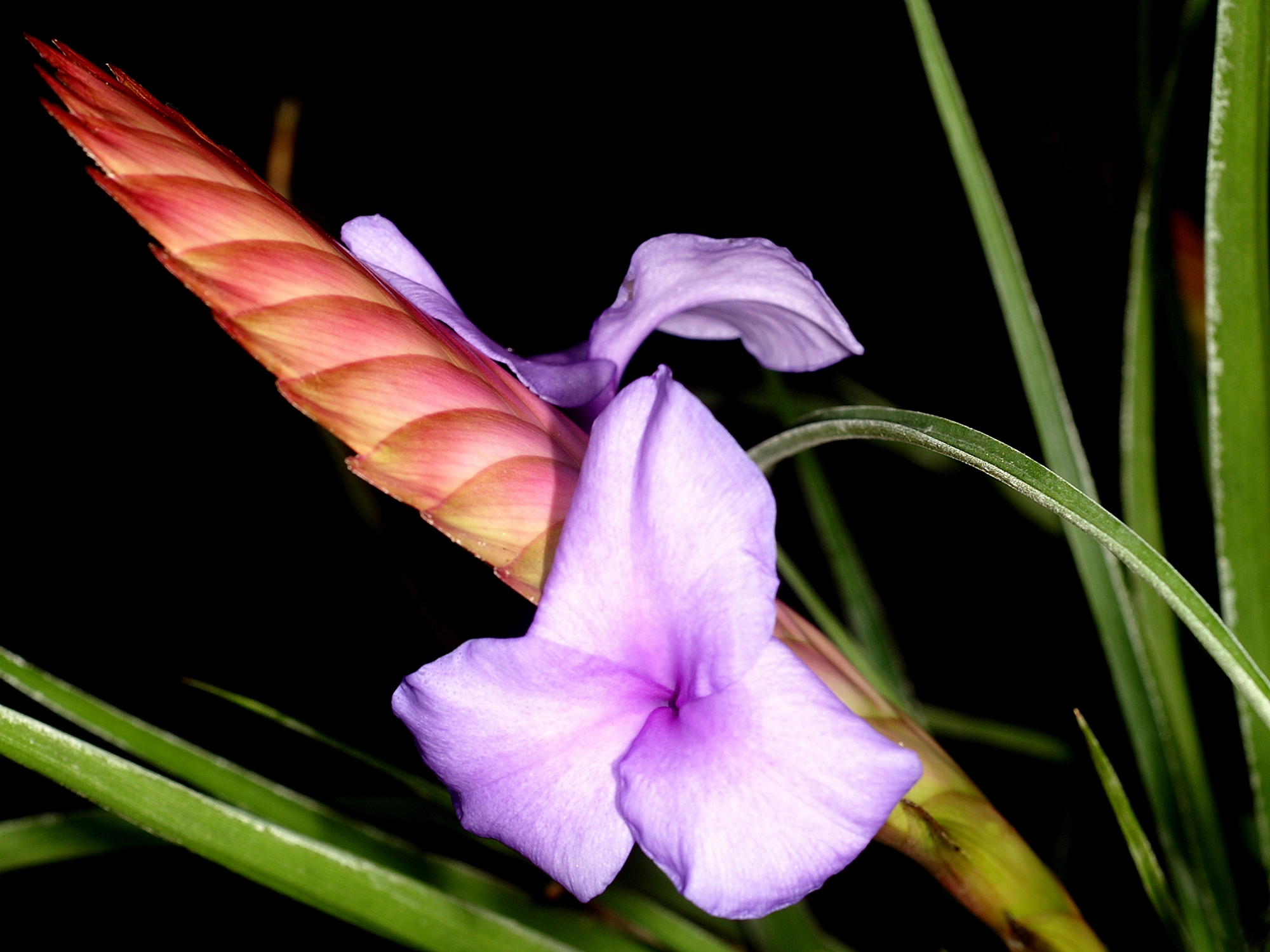

Scientific classification
- Kingdom: Plantae
- Clade: Tracheophytes
- Clade: Angiosperms
- Clade: Monocots
- Clade: Commelinids
- Order: Poales
- Family: Bromeliaceae
- Genus: Tillandsia
- Subgenus: Tillandsia subg. Tillandsia
- Species: T. guatemalensis

Binomial name
- Tillandsia guatemalensis L.B.Sm.

Synonyms
- Allardtia cyanea A.Dietr.; Tillandsia columnaris E.Morren ex Baker; Tillandsia uyucensis Gilmartin

= Tillandsia guatemalensis =

Species of plant

Tillandsia guatemalensis is a species of flowering plant in the genus Tillandsia. This species is native to Mexico and Central America.
