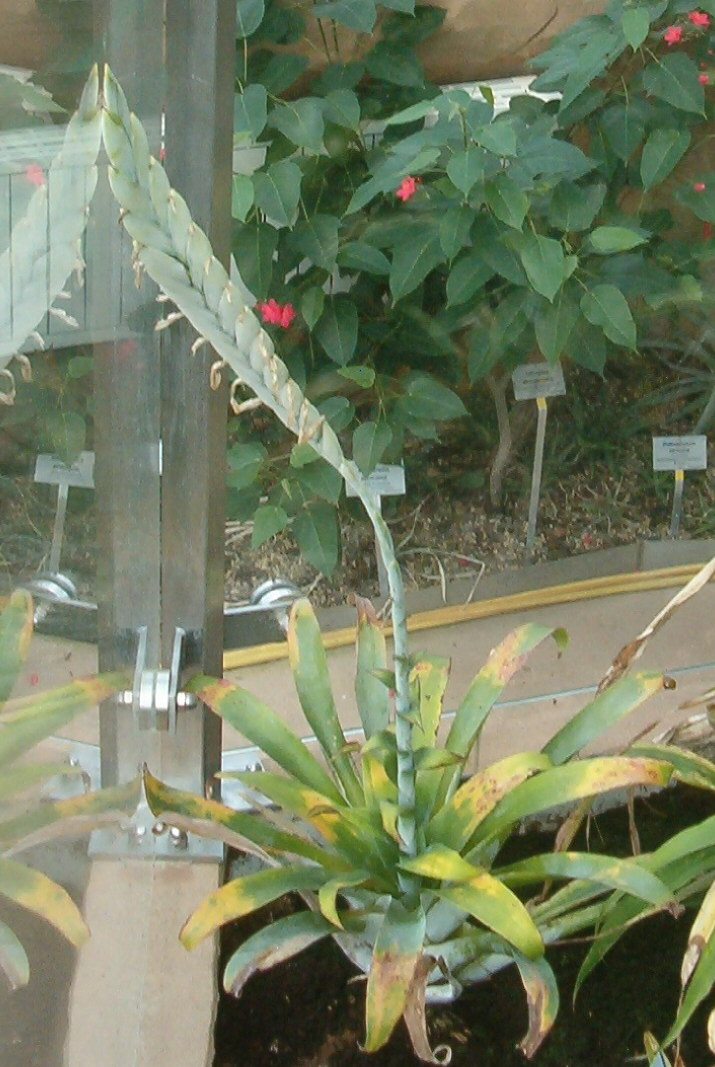

Scientific classification
- Kingdom: Plantae
- Clade: Tracheophytes
- Clade: Angiosperms
- Clade: Monocots
- Clade: Commelinids
- Order: Poales
- Family: Bromeliaceae
- Genus: Tillandsia
- Subgenus: Tillandsia subg. Tillandsia
- Species: T. heterophylla

Binomial name
- Tillandsia heterophylla E.Morren

= Tillandsia heterophylla =

Species of plant

Tillandsia heterophylla is a species of evergreen flowering plant in the genus Tillandsia. It is endemic to Mexico.
