= Tillandsia × rectifolia =

Scientific classification
- Kingdom: Plantae
- Clade: Tracheophytes
- Clade: Angiosperms
- Clade: Monocots
- Clade: Commelinids
- Order: Poales
- Family: Bromeliaceae
- Genus: Tillandsia
- Species: T. × rectifolia

Binomial name
- Tillandsia × rectifolia C.A.Wiley

Tillandsia × rectifolia is a natural hybrid of T. schiedeana and T. ionantha. This plant is native to Costa Rica and Mexico.

== Bibliography ==
- Luther, Harry E. (1995). "An Annotated Checklist of the Bromeliaceae of Costa Rica". Selbyana. 16 (2): 230–234. ISSN 0361-185X. JSTOR 41759911.
- Espejo-Serna, Adolfo; López-Ferrari, Ana Rosa; Ramírez-morillo, Ivón; Holst, Bruce K.; Luther, Harry E.; Till, Walter (1 June 2004). "Checklist of Mexican Bromeliaceae with Notes on Species Distribution and Levels of Endemism". Selbyana. 25 (1): 33–86. ISSN 2689-0682. JSTOR 41760147.
