= Tillandsia dexteri =

Scientific classification
- Kingdom: Plantae
- Clade: Tracheophytes
- Clade: Angiosperms
- Clade: Monocots
- Clade: Commelinids
- Order: Poales
- Family: Bromeliaceae
- Genus: Tillandsia
- Subgenus: Tillandsia subg. Tillandsia
- Species: T. dexteri

Binomial name
- Tillandsia dexteri H.Luther

Species of plant

Tillandsia dexteri is a perennial plant species in the genus Tillandsia and in the taxonomic family bromeliads (Bromeliaceae). This species is native to Costa Rica in the neotropical realm. It was discovered in 1989 by H.Luther.
