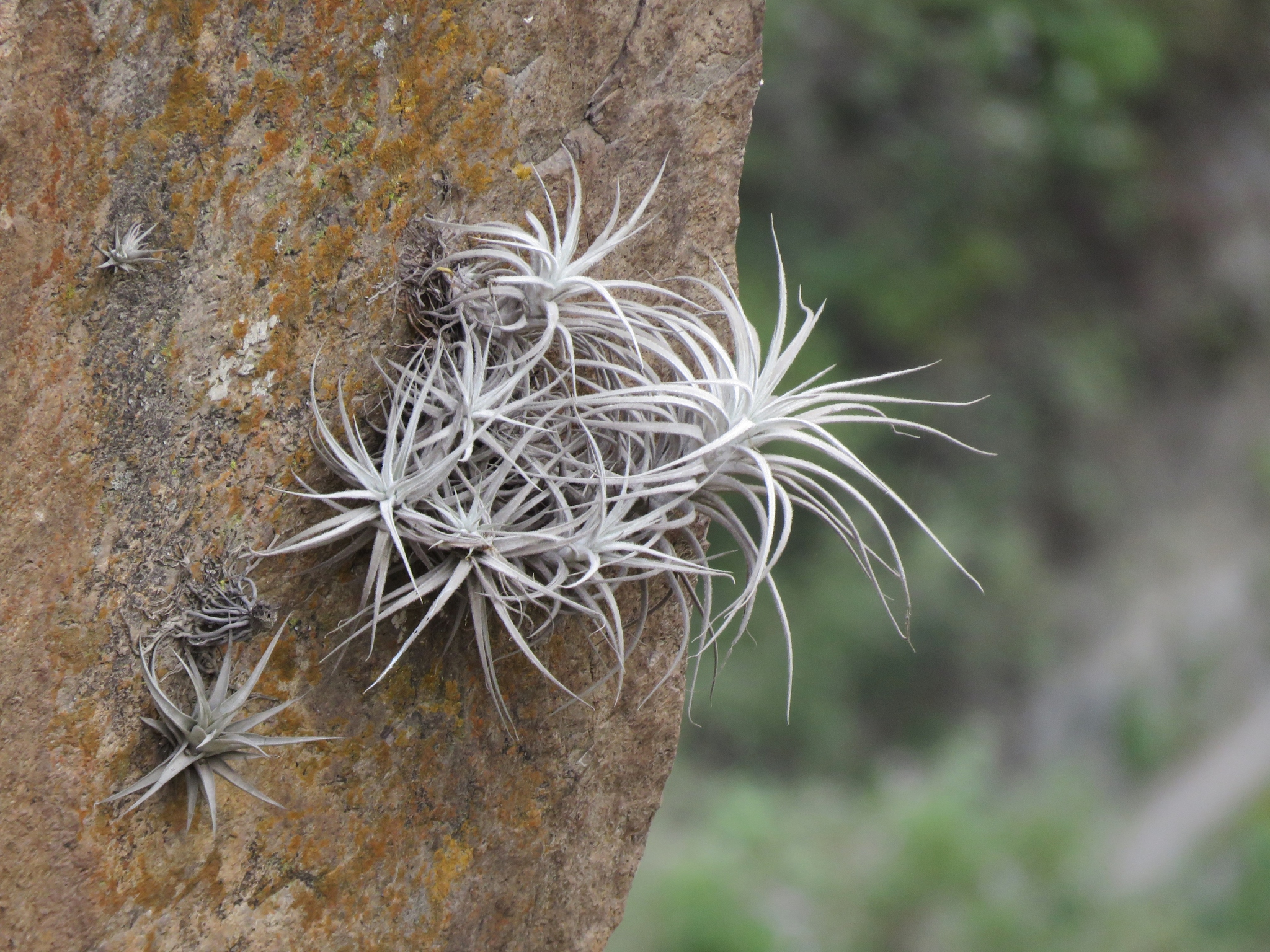
- Tillandsia tectorum

Scientific classification
- Kingdom: Plantae
- Clade: Tracheophytes
- Clade: Angiosperms
- Clade: Monocots
- Clade: Commelinids
- Order: Poales
- Family: Bromeliaceae
- Genus: Tillandsia
- Subgenus: Tillandsia subg. Allardtia (A. Dietrich) Baker

Species
- See text

= Tillandsia subg. Allardtia =

Subgenus of flowering plants

Tillandsia subg. Allardtia is a subgenus of the genus Tillandsia.

== Species ==
- Tillandsia abbreviata H. Luther
- Tillandsia acuminata L.B. Smith
- Tillandsia adpressiflora Mez
- Tillandsia aequatorialis L.B. Smith
- Tillandsia alvareziae Rauh
- Tillandsia antillana L.B. Smith
- Tillandsia archeri L.B. Smith
- Tillandsia arenicola L.B. Smith
- Tillandsia atroviridipetala Matuda
- Tillandsia australis Mez
- Tillandsia bakiorum H. Luther
- Tillandsia balsasensis Rauh
- Tillandsia barbeyana Wittmack
- Tillandsia barthlottii Rauh
- Tillandsia biflora Ruiz & Pavón
- Tillandsia boliviana Mez
- Tillandsia boliviensis Baker
- Tillandsia bongarana L.B. Smith
- Tillandsia brenneri Rauh
- Tillandsia brevilingua Mez ex Harms
- Tillandsia breviturneri Betancur & N. García
- Tillandsia buchlohii Rauh
- Tillandsia buseri Mez
- Tillandsia cajamarcensis Rauh
- Tillandsia calochlamys Ehlers & L. Hromadnik
- Tillandsia caloura Harms
- Tillandsia cardenasii L.B. Smith
- Tillandsia carrierei André
- Tillandsia cauliflora Mez & Wercklé ex Mez
- Tillandsia cauligera Mez
- Tillandsia cernua L.B. Smith
- Tillandsia cerrateana L.B. Smith
- Tillandsia chaetophylla Mez
- Tillandsia chiletensis Rauh
- Tillandsia churinensis Rauh
- Tillandsia chusgonensis L. Hromadnik
- Tillandsia clavigera Mez
- Tillandsia cochabambae E. Gross & Rauh
- Tillandsia coinaensis Ehlers
- Tillandsia compacta Grisebach
- Tillandsia complanata Bentham
- Tillandsia confertiflora André
- Tillandsia confinis L.B. Smith
- Tillandsia cuatrecasasii L.B. Smith
- Tillandsia cucullata L.B. Smith
- Tillandsia demissa L.B. Smith
- Tillandsia denudata André
- Tillandsia dexteri H. Luther
- Tillandsia dichrophylla L.B. Smith
- Tillandsia disticha Kunth
- Tillandsia dorotheehaseae Hase
- Tillandsia dudleyi L.B. Smith
- Tillandsia dura Baker
- Tillandsia edithae Rauh
- Tillandsia elongata Kunth
- Tillandsia elvira-grossiae Rauh
- Tillandsia emergens Mez & Sodiro ex Mez
- Tillandsia engleriana Wittmack
- Tillandsia ermitae L. Hromadnik
- Tillandsia excavata L.B. Smith
- Tillandsia excelsa Grisebach
- Tillandsia fassettii L.B. Smith
- Tillandsia fendleri Grisebach
- Tillandsia floribunda Kunth
- Tillandsia francisci W. Till & J.R. Grant
- Tillandsia fusiformis L.B. Smith
- Tillandsia gerdae Ehlers
- Tillandsia gerd-muelleri W. Weber
- Tillandsia glauca L.B. Smith
- Tillandsia glossophylla L.B. Smith
- Tillandsia guatemalensis L.B. Smith
- Tillandsia gymnobotrya Baker
- Tillandsia hegeri Ehlers
- Tillandsia helmutii L. Hromadnik
- Tillandsia heterophylla E. Morren
- Tillandsia hirtzii Rauh
- Tillandsia hoeijeri H. Luther
- Tillandsia hotteana Urban
- Tillandsia huarazensis Ehlers & W. Till
- Tillandsia humboldtii Baker
- Tillandsia ignesiae Mez
- Tillandsia imporaensis Ehlers
- Tillandsia incarnata Kunth
- Tillandsia indigofera Mez & Sodiro
- Tillandsia interrupta Mez
- Tillandsia ionochroma André ex Mez
- Tillandsia kauffmannii Ehlers
- Tillandsia kessleri H. Luther
- Tillandsia koideae Rauh & E. Gross
- Tillandsia krahnii Rauh
- Tillandsia krukoffiana L.B. Smith
- Tillandsia kuntzeana Mez
- Tillandsia lajensis André
- Tillandsia laminata L.B. Smith
- Tillandsia latifolia Meyen
- Tillandsia leiboldiana Schlechtendal
- Tillandsia lithophila L. Hromadnik
- Tillandsia longifolia Baker
- Tillandsia lopezii L.B. Smith
- Tillandsia lotteae H. Hromadnik
- Tillandsia loxichaensis Ehlers
- Tillandsia lucida E. Morren ex Baker
- Tillandsia macrodactylon Mez
- Tillandsia maculata Ruiz & Pavón
- Tillandsia makrinii L. Hromadnik
- Tillandsia malyi L. Hromadnik
- Tillandsia marnieri-lapostollei Rauh
- Tillandsia mauryana L.B. Smith
- Tillandsia micans L.B. Smith
- Tillandsia myriantha Baker
- Tillandsia nervisepala (Gilmartin) L.B. Smith
- Tillandsia nolleriana Ehlers
- Tillandsia oblivata L. Hromadnik
- Tillandsia oerstediana L.B. Smith
- Tillandsia orbicularis L.B. Smith
- Tillandsia orogenes Standley & L.O. Williams
- Tillandsia oroyensis Mez
- Tillandsia oxapampae Rauh & von Bismarck
- Tillandsia pachyaxon L.B. Smith
- Tillandsia pallescens Betancur & N. García
- Tillandsia pastensis André
- Tillandsia penascoensis Ehlers & Lautner
- Tillandsia pentasticha Rauh & Wülfinghoff
- Tillandsia pinnatodigitata Mez
- Tillandsia plumosa Baker
- Tillandsia polyantha Mez & Sodiro
- Tillandsia pomacochae Rauh
- Tillandsia pseudocardenasii W. Weber
- Tillandsia pseudomicans Rauh
- Tillandsia purpurascens Rauh
- Tillandsia pyramidata André
- Tillandsia queroensis Gilmartin
- Tillandsia raackii H. Luther
- Tillandsia racinae L.B. Smith
- Tillandsia rariflora André
- Tillandsia rauschii Rauh & Lehmann
- Tillandsia reducta L.B. Smith
- Tillandsia remota Wittmack
- Tillandsia restrepoana André
- Tillandsia reuteri Rauh
- Tillandsia reversa L.B. Smith
- Tillandsia rhodosticta L.B. Smith
- Tillandsia roezlii E. Morren
- Tillandsia romeroi L.B. Smith
- Tillandsia rubella Baker
- Tillandsia rubia Ehlers & L. Colgan
- Tillandsia rubroviolacea Rauh
- Tillandsia rudolfii E. Gross & Hase
- Tillandsia rupicola Baker
- Tillandsia rusbyi Baker
- Tillandsia sagasteguii L.B. Smith
- Tillandsia samaipatensis W. Till
- Tillandsia sangii Ehlers
- Tillandsia santieusebii Morillo & Oliva-Esteva
- Tillandsia sceptriformis Mez & Sodiro ex Mez
- Tillandsia schimperiana Wittmack
- Tillandsia schultzei Harms
- Tillandsia secunda Kunth
- Tillandsia selleana Harms
- Tillandsia sessemocinoi Lopez-Ferrari, Espejo & P. Blanco
- Tillandsia sigmoidea L.B. Smith
- Tillandsia sodiroi Mez
- Tillandsia somnians L.B. Smith
- Tillandsia sphaerocephala Baker
- Tillandsia standleyi L.B. Smith
- Tillandsia stellifera L. Hromadnik
- Tillandsia stenoura Harms
- Tillandsia stipitata L.B. Smith
- Tillandsia subconcolor L.B. Smith
- Tillandsia suescana L.B. Smith
- Tillandsia superba Mez & Sodiro
- Tillandsia tectorum E. Morren
- Tillandsia tomekii L. Hromadnik
- Tillandsia tortilis Klotzsch ex Baker
- Tillandsia tovarensis Mez
- Tillandsia tragophoba Dillon
- Tillandsia truxillana L.B. Smith
- Tillandsia turneri Baker
- Tillandsia ultima L.B. Smith
- Tillandsia violascens Mez
- Tillandsia walteri Mez
- Tillandsia werdermannii Harms
- Tillandsia wurdackii L.B. Smith
- Tillandsia zaratensis W. Weber
- Tillandsia zarumensis Gilmartin
- Tillandsia zecheri W. Till
