= T. floribunda =

T. floribunda may refer to:

- Tabernaemontana floribunda, a plant with fragrant flowers
- Thibaudia floribunda, a New World plant
- Tillandsia floribunda, a plant native to Ecuador
- Tournefortia floribunda, a drupe-bearing plant
- Triphysaria floribunda, a rare broomrape
- Turraea floribunda, a tropical plant
- Tylophora floribunda, a synonym of Vincetoxicum polyanthum, an Australian dogbane
