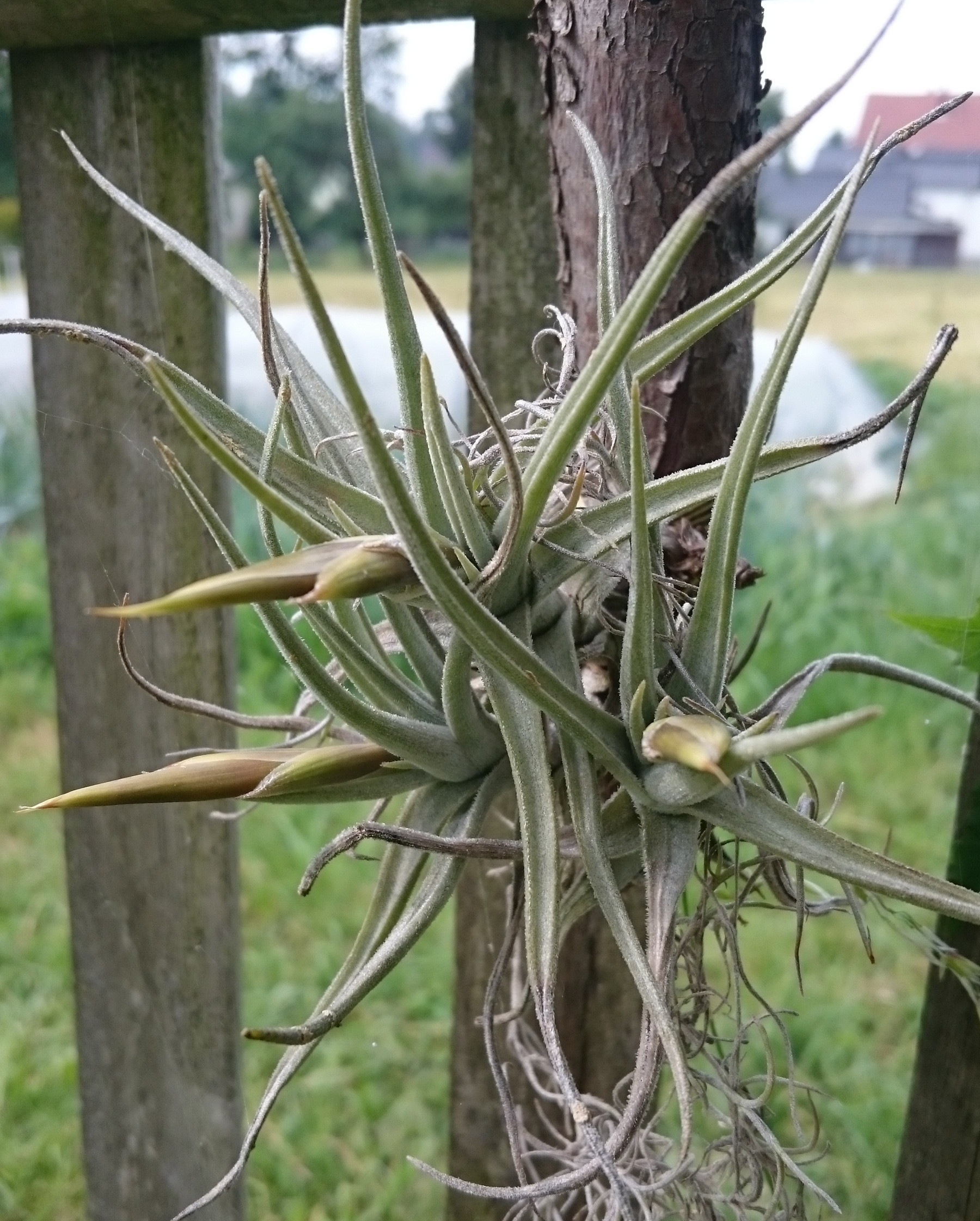
- Tillandsia xiphioides

Scientific classification
- Kingdom: Plantae
- Clade: Tracheophytes
- Clade: Angiosperms
- Clade: Monocots
- Clade: Commelinids
- Order: Poales
- Family: Bromeliaceae
- Genus: Tillandsia
- Subgenus: Tillandsia subg. Aerobia; Mez

Species
- See text

= Tillandsia subg. Aerobia =

Subgenus of flowering plants

Tillandsia subg. Aerobia is a subgenus of the genus Tillandsia.

== Species ==
Species accepted by Encyclopedia of Bromeliads as of October 2022:

- Tillandsia afonsoana T.Strehl
- Tillandsia arequitae (André) André ex Mez
- Tillandsia argentina C.Wright
- Tillandsia baguagrandensis Rauh
- Tillandsia barfussii W.Till
- Tillandsia barrosoae W.Till
- Tillandsia bermejoensis H.Hrom.
- Tillandsia boliviensis Baker emend. L.B. Sm.
- Tillandsia bonita Versieux & Martinelli
- Tillandsia buchlohii Rauh
- Tillandsia camargoensis L.Hrom.
- Tillandsia cardenasii L.B.Sm.
- Tillandsia caulescens Brongn. ex Baker
- Tillandsia chiletensis Rauh
- Tillandsia cochabambae E.Gross & Rauh
- Tillandsia colganii Ehlers
- Tillandsia colorata L.Hrom.
- Tillandsia comarapaensis H.Luther
- Tillandsia diaguitensis A.Cast.
- Tillandsia didisticha (E.Morren) Baker
- Tillandsia dorisdaltoniae P.L.Ibisch, R.Vasquez & W.Till
- Tillandsia dorotheae Rauh emend. Gouda
- Tillandsia erici Ehlers
- Tillandsia friesii Mez
- Tillandsia genseri Rauh emend. Gouda
- Tillandsia gerdae Ehlers
- Tillandsia goyazensis Mez
- Tillandsia hasei Ehlers & L.Hrom.
- Tillandsia hegeri Ehlers
- Tillandsia helmutii L.Hrom.
- Tillandsia koehresiana Ehlers
- Tillandsia lechneri W.Till & Barfuss
- Tillandsia lorentziana Griseb.
- Tillandsia lotteae H.Hrom. ex Rauh
- Tillandsia markusii L.Hrom.
- Tillandsia mereliana Schinini
- Tillandsia muhriae W.Weber
- Tillandsia oropezana L.Hrom.
- Tillandsia pfeufferi Rauh emend. Gouda
- Tillandsia prolata (H.Luther) Gouda & Barfuss
- Tillandsia pseudocardenasii W.Weber
- Tillandsia ramellae W.Till & S.Till
- Tillandsia recurvispica L.Hrom. & P.Schneider
- Tillandsia rosacea L.Hrom. & W.Till
- Tillandsia rosarioae L.Hrom.
- Tillandsia tafiensis (L.B.Sm.) Gouda
- Tillandsia uruguayensis Rossado
- Tillandsia vernicosa Baker
- Tillandsia violaceiflora L.Hromadnik
- Tillandsia walter-richteri W.Weber ex Gouda
- Tillandsia xiphioides Ker Gawl.
- Tillandsia yuncharaensis W.Till
- Tillandsia zecheri W.Till
