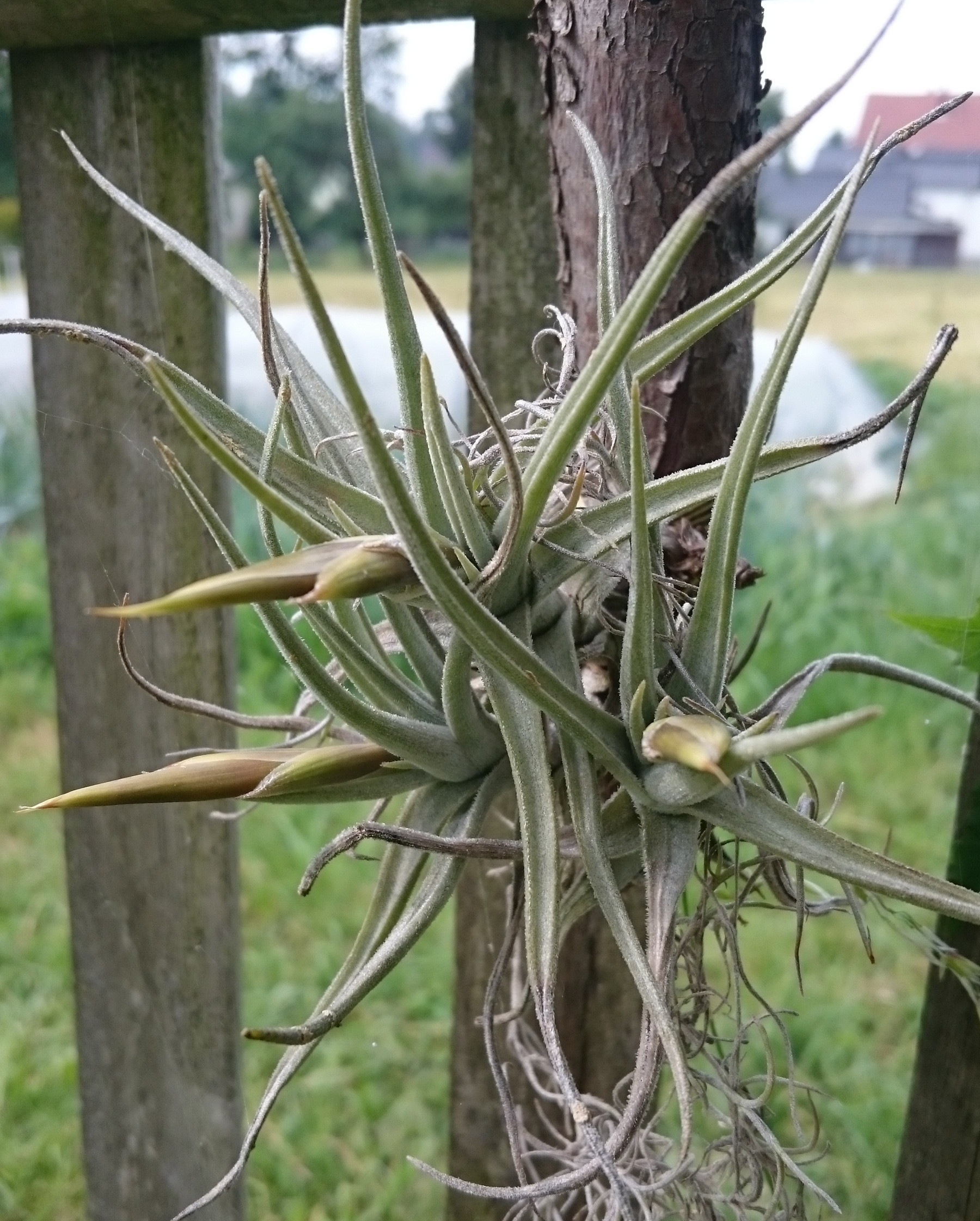

Scientific classification
- Kingdom: Plantae
- Clade: Tracheophytes
- Clade: Angiosperms
- Clade: Monocots
- Clade: Commelinids
- Order: Poales
- Family: Bromeliaceae
- Genus: Tillandsia
- Subgenus: Tillandsia subg. Aerobia
- Species: T. xiphioides

Binomial name
- Tillandsia xiphioides Ker Gawl.

Synonyms
- Anoplophytum xiphioides (Ker Gawl.) Beer ex Baker; Tillandsia suaveolens Lem.; Tillandsia macrocnemis Griseb.; Tillandsia sericea Baker; Tillandsia xiphioides var. lutea L.Hrom.

= Tillandsia xiphioides =

Species of epiphyte

Tillandsia xiphioides is a species in the genus Tillandsia. This species is native to Bolivia, Brazil, Paraguay, Uruguay, and Argentina.

Four infraspecific taxa are recognized:

1. Tillandsia xiphioides var. minor L.Hrom. – Argentina
2. Tillandsia xiphioides subsp. prolata H.E.Luther – Bolivia
3. Tillandsia xiphioides var. tafiensis L.B.Sm – Argentina
4. Tillandsia xiphioides subsp. xiphioides – most of species range

== Cultivars ==
- Tillandsia 'Folly'
- Tillandsia 'Mystic Trumpet'
- Tillandsia 'Mystic Trumpet Peach'
- Tillandsia 'Mystic Trumpet Pink'
