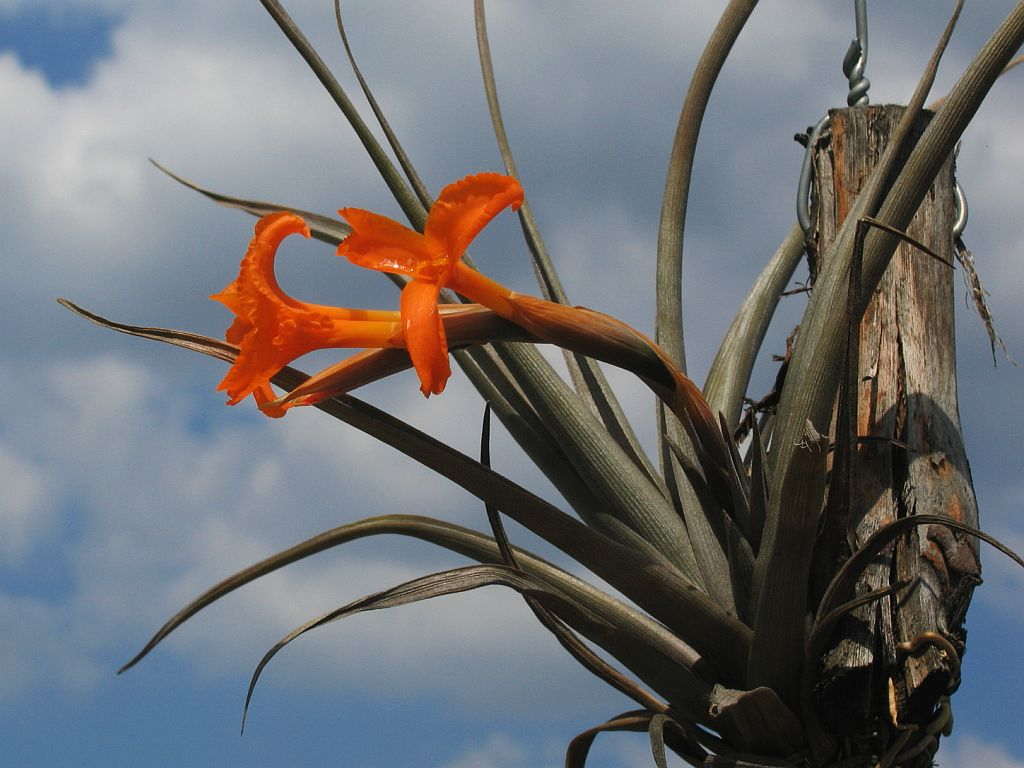
- Tillandsia erici in cultivation at the Botanical Garden of Heidelberg, Germany.

Scientific classification
- Kingdom: Plantae
- Clade: Tracheophytes
- Clade: Angiosperms
- Clade: Monocots
- Clade: Commelinids
- Order: Poales
- Family: Bromeliaceae
- Genus: Tillandsia
- Subgenus: Tillandsia subg. Aerobia
- Species: T. erici

Binomial name
- Tillandsia erici Ehlers

= Tillandsia erici =

Species of plant

Tillandsia erici is a species in the genus Tillandsia. This species is endemic to Bolivia.
