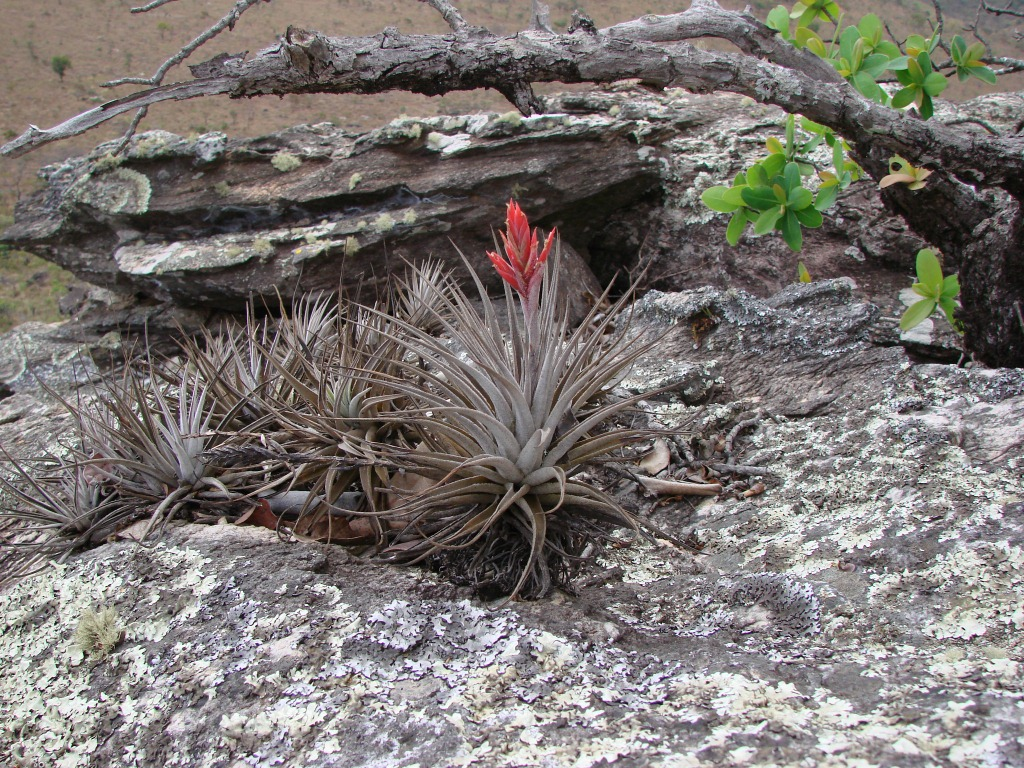

Scientific classification
- Kingdom: Plantae
- Clade: Tracheophytes
- Clade: Angiosperms
- Clade: Monocots
- Clade: Commelinids
- Order: Poales
- Family: Bromeliaceae
- Genus: Tillandsia
- Subgenus: Tillandsia subg. Aerobia
- Species: T. didisticha

Binomial name
- Tillandsia didisticha (E.Morren) Baker

Synonyms
- Anoplophytum didistichum E.Morren; Guzmania complanata Wittm. Tillandsia crassifolia Baker; Tillandsia goyazensis Mez; Tillandsia oranensis Baker

= Tillandsia didisticha =

Species of plant

Tillandsia didisticha is a species of flowering plant in the Bromeliaceae family. It is native to Bolivia and Brazil.

== Cultivars ==
- Tillandsia 'Burnt Fingers'
