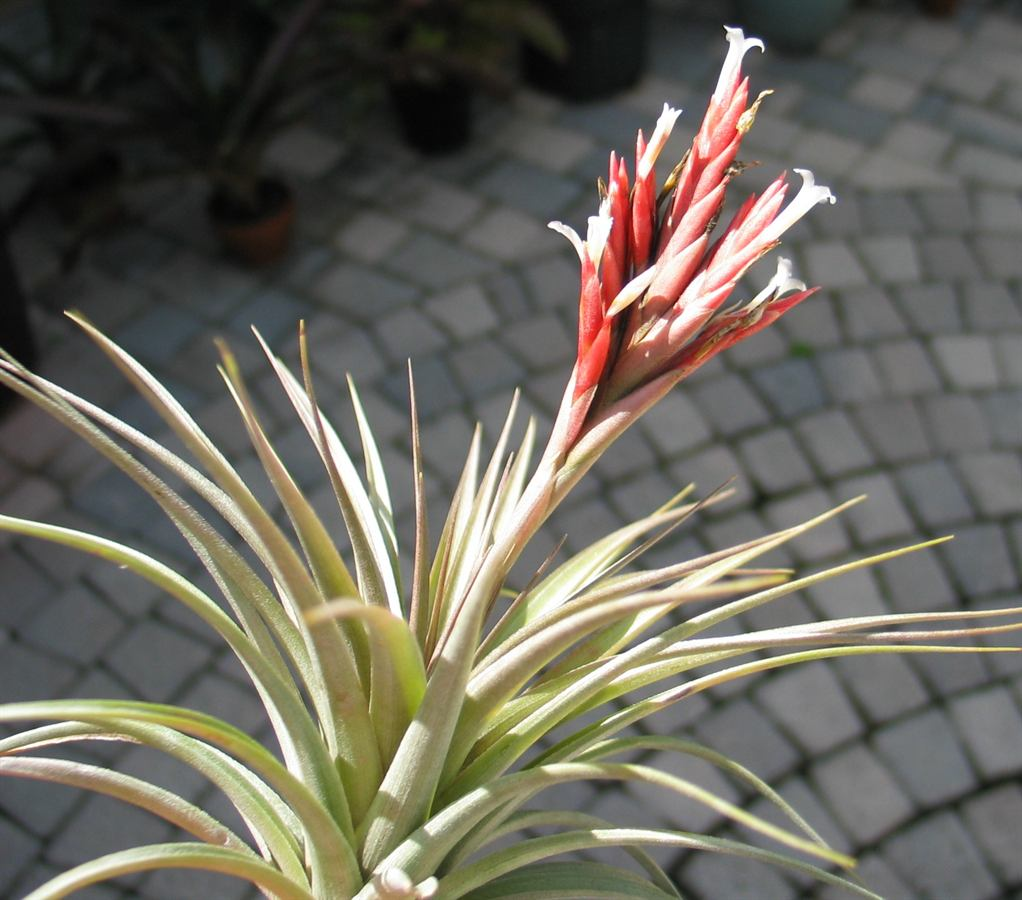

Scientific classification
- Kingdom: Plantae
- Clade: Tracheophytes
- Clade: Angiosperms
- Clade: Monocots
- Clade: Commelinids
- Order: Poales
- Family: Bromeliaceae
- Genus: Tillandsia
- Subgenus: Tillandsia subg. Aerobia
- Species: T. vernicosa

Binomial name
- Tillandsia vernicosa Baker

Synonyms
- Tillandsia drepanophylla Baker; Tillandsia polyphylla Baker

= Tillandsia vernicosa =

Species of plant

Tillandsia vernicosa is a species of flowering plant in the Bromeliaceae family. This species is native to Bolivia, Argentina and Paraguay.

== Cultivars ==
- Tillandsia 'Evita'
