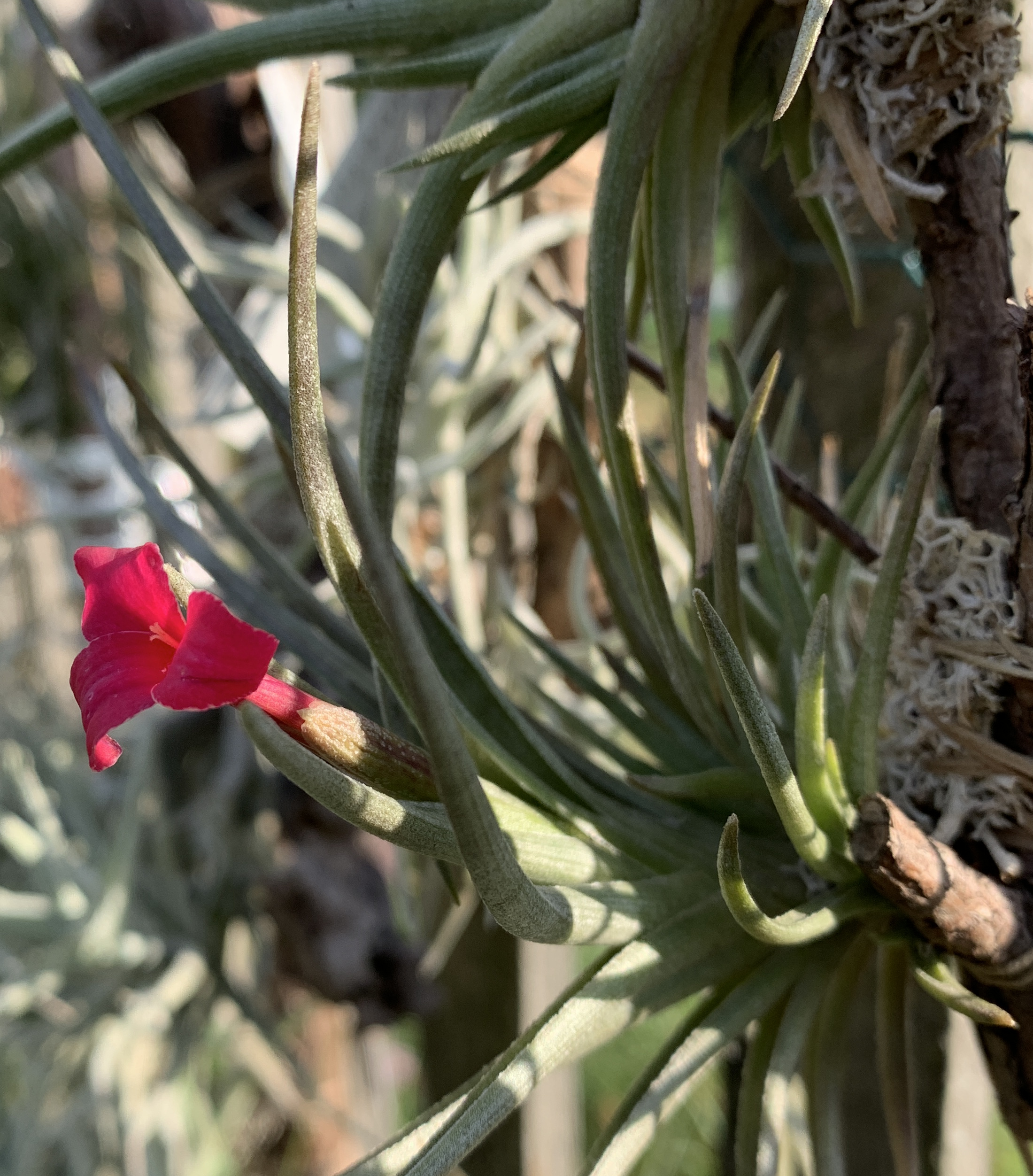

Scientific classification
- Kingdom: Plantae
- Clade: Tracheophytes
- Clade: Angiosperms
- Clade: Monocots
- Clade: Commelinids
- Order: Poales
- Family: Bromeliaceae
- Genus: Tillandsia
- Subgenus: Tillandsia subg. Aerobia
- Species: T. argentina

Binomial name
- Tillandsia argentina C.H.Wright

= Tillandsia argentina =

Species of plant

Tillandsia argentina is a species in the genus Tillandsia. This species is native to Bolivia and northern Argentina.

== Cultivars ==
- Tillandsia 'Evita'
