= Tillandsia afonsoana =

Scientific classification
- Kingdom: Plantae
- Clade: Tracheophytes
- Clade: Angiosperms
- Clade: Monocots
- Clade: Commelinids
- Order: Poales
- Family: Bromeliaceae
- Genus: Tillandsia
- Subgenus: Tillandsia subg. Aerobia
- Species: T. afonsoana

Binomial name
- Tillandsia afonsoana T.Strehl

Species of plant

Tillandsia afonsoana is a species in the genus Tillandsia. This species is native to Brazil.
