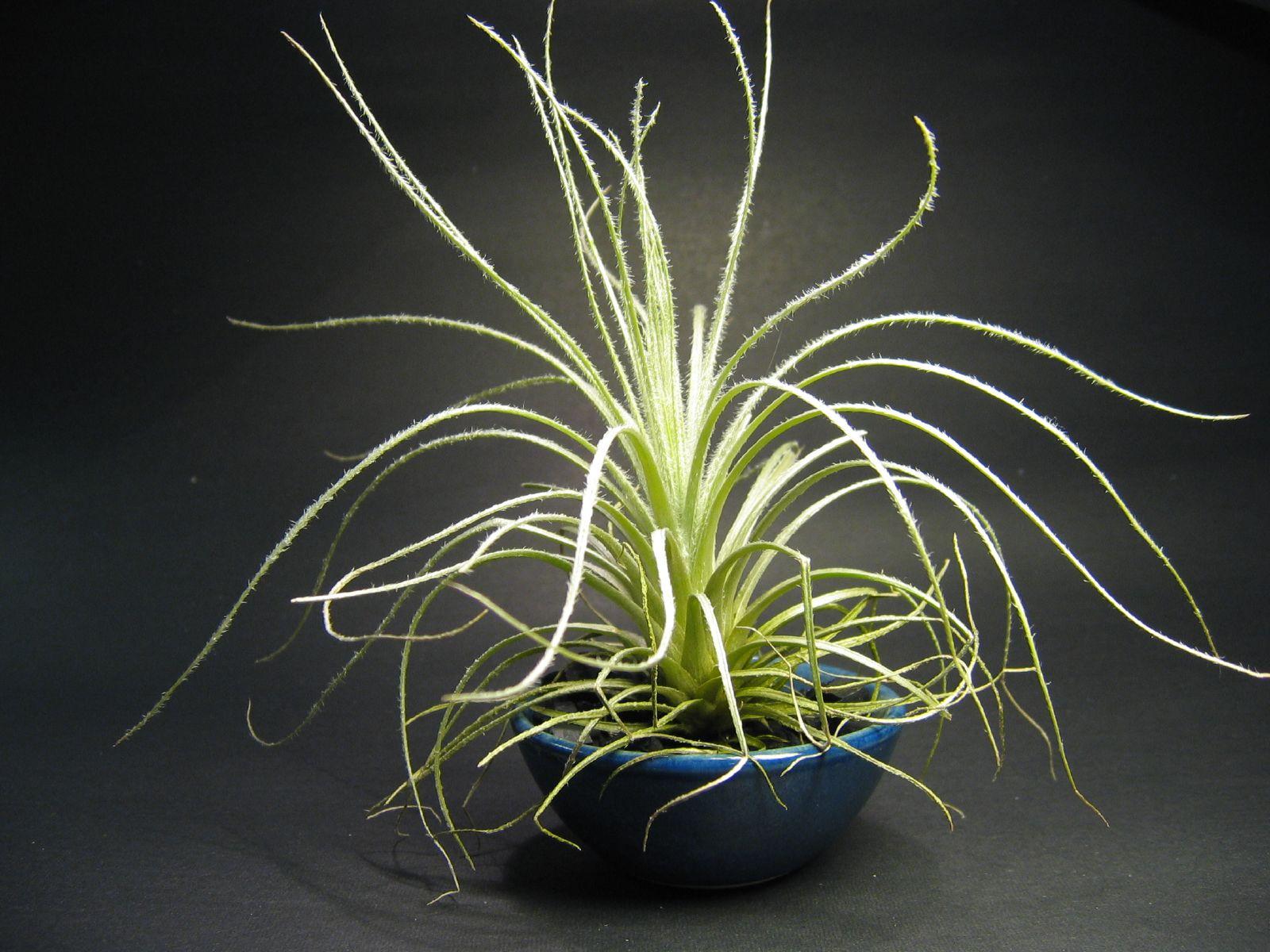
- Tillandsia tectorum

Scientific classification
- Kingdom: Plantae
- Clade: Tracheophytes
- Clade: Angiosperms
- Clade: Monocots
- Clade: Commelinids
- Order: Poales
- Family: Bromeliaceae
- Genus: Tillandsia
- Subgenus: Tillandsia subg. Viridantha (Espejo) W.Till & Barfuss

Species
- See text

= Tillandsia subg. Viridantha =

Subgenus of flowering plants

Tillandsia subg. Viridantha is a subgenus of the genus Tillandsia.

== Species ==
Species accepted by Encyclopedia of Bromeliads as of October 2022:

| Image | Name | Distribution |
|---|---|---|
| | Tillandsia atroviridipetala Matuda 1957 | Mexico |
| | Tillandsia balsasensis Rauh 1976 | Peru |
| | Tillandsia boqueronensis Ehlers 2009 | Mexico (Oaxaca) |
| | Tillandsia caballosensis Ehlers 2009 | Mexico (Guerrero) |
| | Tillandsia chusgonensis L.Hrom. 2005 | Peru (La Libertad) |
| | Tillandsia curvifolia (Ehlers & Rauh) Ehlers 2009 | Mexico (Zacatecas, Guanajuato) |
| | Tillandsia grandispica Ehlers 2009 | Mexico |
| | Tillandsia hernandezii Gouda (Ined.) 2019 | Mexico (Oaxaca) |
| | Tillandsia heteromorpha Mez 1906 | Peru |
| | Tillandsia ignesiae Mez 1903 | Mexico |
| | Tillandsia lepidosepala L.B.Sm. 1935 | Mexico |
| | Tillandsia lithophila L.Hrom. 2005 | Peru (La Libertad) |
| | Tillandsia malyi L.Hrom. 2005 | Peru (Ancash) |
| | Tillandsia mauryana L.B.Sm. 1937 | Mexico |
| | Tillandsia oblivata L.Hrom. 2005 | Peru (Cajamarca) |
| | Tillandsia pachycaulis (Hern.-Cárdenas, Espejo & López-Ferr.) Ined. 2021 | Mexico (Jalisco) |
| | Tillandsia plumosa Baker 1888 | Mexico |
| | Tillandsia reducta L.B.Sm. 1956 | Peru |
| | Tillandsia rzedowskiana Gouda (Ined.) 2018 | Mexico (Morelos) |
| | Tillandsia secundifolia Gouda (Ined.) 2019 | Mexico (Hidalgo) |
| | Tillandsia stellifera L.Hrom. 2005 | Peru (Ancash) |
| | Tillandsia tectorum E.Morren 1887 | Ecuador to Peru |
| | Tillandsia teloloapanensis Ehlers & Lautner 2009 | Mexico (Guerrero) |
| | Tillandsia tomekii L.Hrom. 2005 | Peru (Ancash) |
| | Tillandsia tortilis Baker 1887 | Mexico |
| | Tillandsia zamudioi (Hern.-Cárdenas, Espejo & López-Ferr.) Ined 2021 | Mexico (Jalisco) |
