= Tillandsia koehresiana =

Scientific classification
- Kingdom: Plantae
- Clade: Tracheophytes
- Clade: Angiosperms
- Clade: Monocots
- Clade: Commelinids
- Order: Poales
- Family: Bromeliaceae
- Genus: Tillandsia
- Subgenus: Tillandsia subg. Aerobia
- Species: T. koehresiana

Binomial name
- Tillandsia koehresiana Ehlers

Species of plant

Tillandsia koehresiana is a species in the genus Tillandsia. This species is endemic to Bolivia.
