= Tillandsia walter-richteri =

Scientific classification
- Kingdom: Plantae
- Clade: Tracheophytes
- Clade: Angiosperms
- Clade: Monocots
- Clade: Commelinids
- Order: Poales
- Family: Bromeliaceae
- Genus: Tillandsia
- Subgenus: Tillandsia subg. Aerobia
- Species: T. X walter-richteri

Binomial name
- Tillandsia X walter-richteri W.Weber

Species of plant

Tillandsia X walter-richteri is a hybrid in the genus Tillandsia.Parental species are Tillandsia tennuifolia and Tillandsia argentina. This hybrid is distributed in Bolivia and Argentina.
