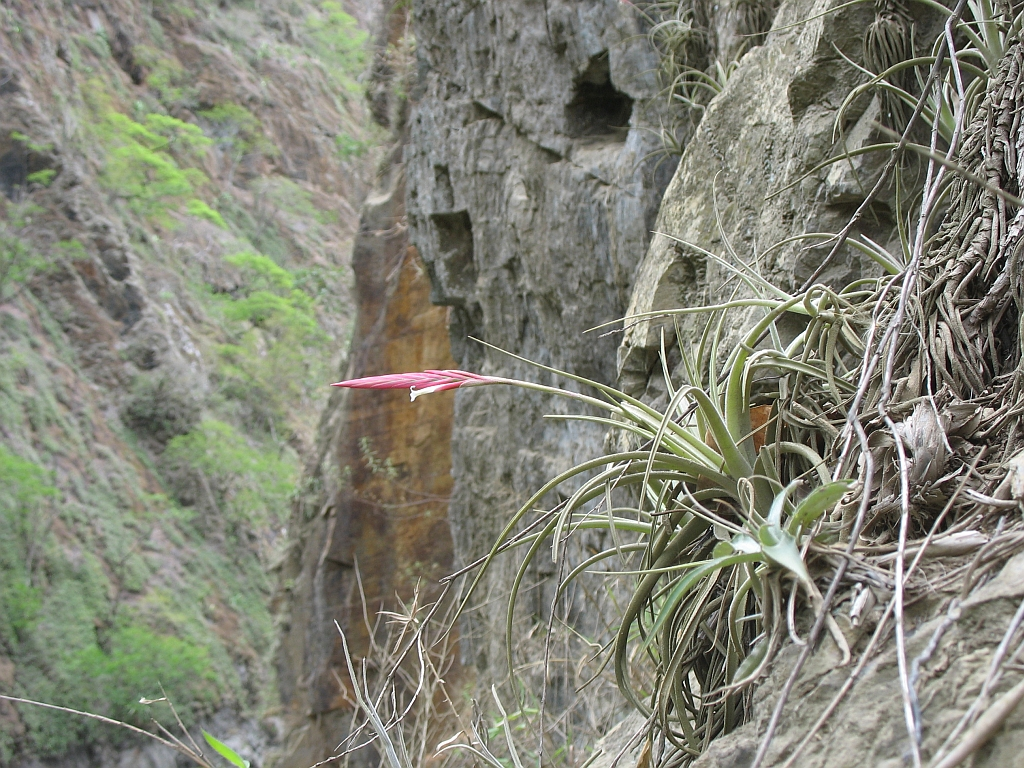

Scientific classification
- Kingdom: Plantae
- Clade: Tracheophytes
- Clade: Angiosperms
- Clade: Monocots
- Clade: Commelinids
- Order: Poales
- Family: Bromeliaceae
- Genus: Tillandsia
- Subgenus: Tillandsia subg. Aerobia
- Species: T. lorentziana

Binomial name
- Tillandsia lorentziana Griseb.

Synonyms
- Tillandsia lorentziana f. simplex Kuntze; Tillandsia lorentzii Andrews

= Tillandsia lorentziana =

Species of plant

Tillandsia lorentziana is a species of flowering plant in the family Bromeliaceae. This species is native to Bolivia and Brazil.
