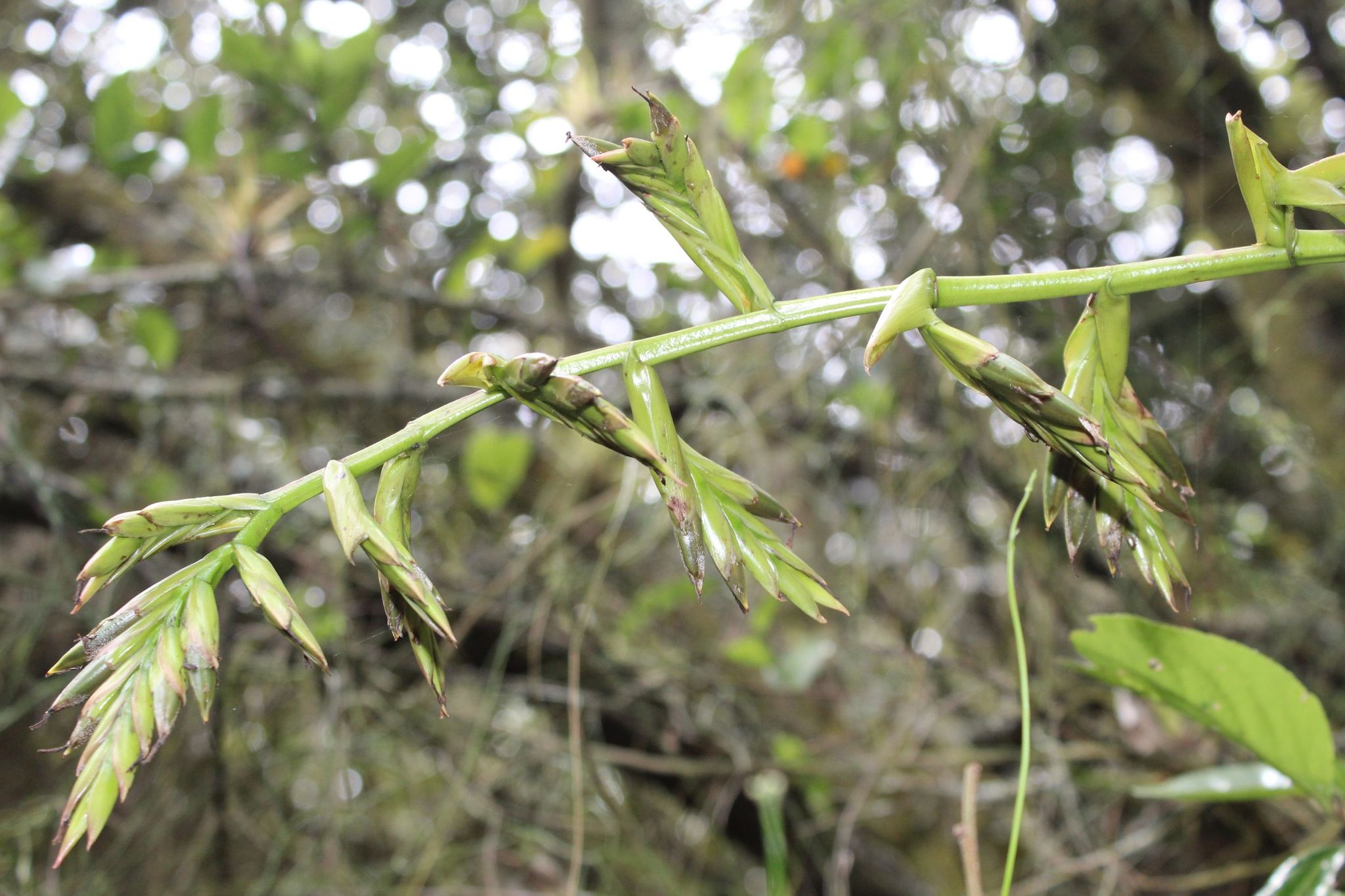

Scientific classification
- Kingdom: Plantae
- Clade: Tracheophytes
- Clade: Angiosperms
- Clade: Monocots
- Clade: Commelinids
- Order: Poales
- Family: Bromeliaceae
- Genus: Tillandsia
- Subgenus: Tillandsia subg. Tillandsia
- Species: T. denudata

Binomial name
- Tillandsia denudata André

= Tillandsia denudata =

Species of plant

Tillandsia denudata is a species of flowering plant in the Bromeliaceae family. It is native to Bolivia, Venezuela and Ecuador.
