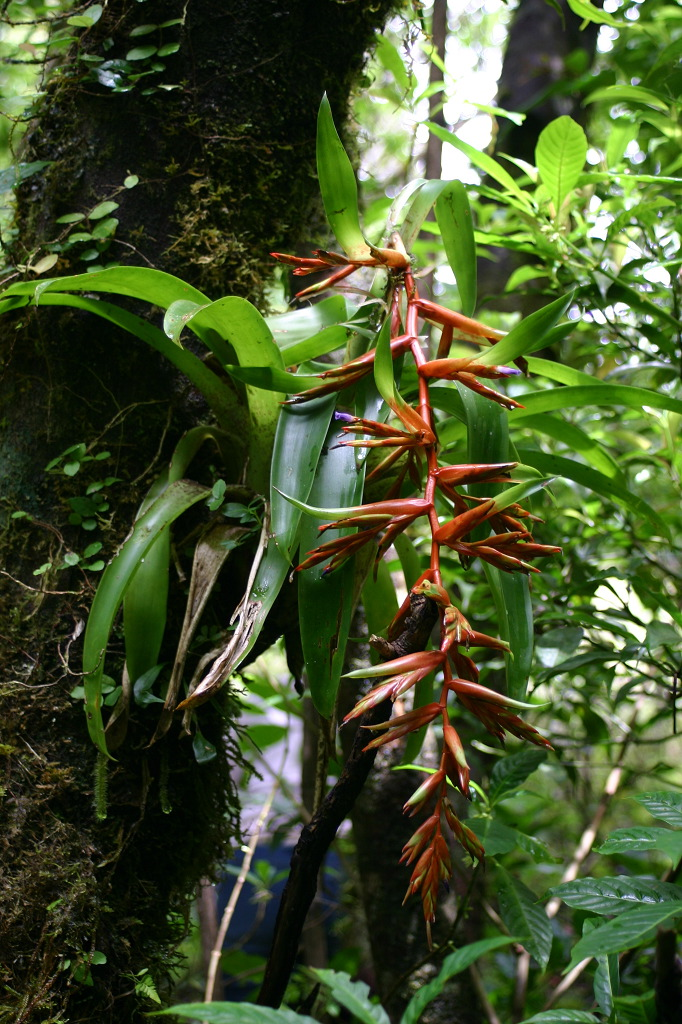

Scientific classification
- Kingdom: Plantae
- Clade: Tracheophytes
- Clade: Angiosperms
- Clade: Monocots
- Clade: Commelinids
- Order: Poales
- Family: Bromeliaceae
- Genus: Tillandsia
- Subgenus: Tillandsia subg. Tillandsia
- Species: T. excelsa

Binomial name
- Tillandsia excelsa Griseb.

Synonyms
- Tillandsia costaricana Mez & Wercklé; Tillandsia werckleana Mez

= Tillandsia excelsa =

Species of epiphyte

Tillandsia excelsa is a species of flowering plant in the family Bromeliaceae. It is native to Central America, Cuba, Jamaica, and the Dominican Republic.
