= Tillandsia rubroviolacea =

Conservation status
- Endangered (IUCN 3.1)

Scientific classification
- Kingdom: Plantae
- Clade: Tracheophytes
- Clade: Angiosperms
- Clade: Monocots
- Clade: Commelinids
- Order: Poales
- Family: Bromeliaceae
- Genus: Tillandsia
- Subgenus: Tillandsia subg. Tillandsia
- Species: T. rubroviolacea

Binomial name
- Tillandsia rubroviolacea Rauh

Species of plant

Tillandsia rubroviolacea is a species of flowering plant in the family Bromeliaceae. It is endemic to Ecuador. Its natural habitat is subtropical or tropical dry shrubland. It is threatened by habitat loss.
