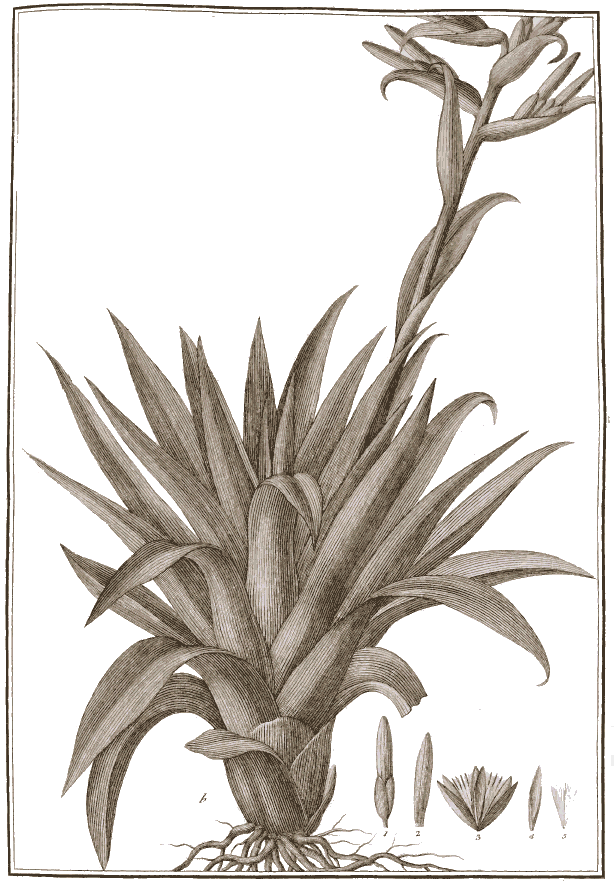
- Illustration of Tillandsia biflora

Scientific classification
- Kingdom: Plantae
- Clade: Tracheophytes
- Clade: Angiosperms
- Clade: Monocots
- Clade: Commelinids
- Order: Poales
- Family: Bromeliaceae
- Genus: Tillandsia
- Subgenus: Tillandsia subg. Tillandsia
- Species: T. biflora

Binomial name
- Tillandsia biflora Ruiz & Pav.

Synonyms
- Diaphoranthema biflora (Ruiz & Pav.) Beer; Tillandsia augustae-regiae Mez; Tillandsia biflora var. cruenta André ex Wittm.; Tillandsia grisebachiana Baker; Tillandsia violacea Klotzsch ex Beer

= Tillandsia biflora =

Species of plant

Tillandsia biflora is a species of flowering plant in the family Bromeliaceae. It is native to Panama, Nicaragua, Colombia, Peru, Bolivia, Costa Rica, Venezuela and Ecuador.
