= Tillandsia confinis =

Scientific classification
- Kingdom: Plantae
- Clade: Tracheophytes
- Clade: Angiosperms
- Clade: Monocots
- Clade: Commelinids
- Order: Poales
- Family: Bromeliaceae
- Genus: Tillandsia
- Subgenus: Tillandsia subg. Tillandsia
- Species: T. confinis

Binomial name
- Tillandsia confinis L.B.Sm.

Synonyms
- Tillandsia subtropicalis L.B.Sm.; Tillandsia dudleyi L.B.Sm.; Tillandsia abysmophila L.B.Sm. & Steyerm.

Species of plant

Tillandsia confinis is a species of flowering plant in the genus Tillandsia. This species is native to Venezuela, Bolivia Colombia, Peru, northern Brazil, and Ecuador.

Two varieties are recognized:

1. Tillandsia confinis var. confinis – most of species range
2. Tillandsia confinis var. caudata L.B.Sm. – Colombia, Ecuador
