= Tillandsia pyramidata =

Scientific classification
- Kingdom: Plantae
- Clade: Tracheophytes
- Clade: Angiosperms
- Clade: Monocots
- Clade: Commelinids
- Order: Poales
- Family: Bromeliaceae
- Genus: Tillandsia
- Subgenus: Tillandsia subg. Tillandsia
- Species: T. pyramidata

Binomial name
- Tillandsia pyramidata André

Species of plant

Tillandsia pyramidata is a species of flowering plant in the family Bromeliaceae. It is native to Bolivia, Venezuela, Colombia, and Ecuador. Two varieties are recognized:

1. Tillandsia pyramidata var. pyramidata – Venezuela, Colombia, Ecuador, Peru
2. Tillandsia pyramidata var. vivipara Rauh – Ecuador and Junín Province of Peru
