= Tillandsia schultzei =

Scientific classification
- Kingdom: Plantae
- Clade: Tracheophytes
- Clade: Angiosperms
- Clade: Monocots
- Clade: Commelinids
- Order: Poales
- Family: Bromeliaceae
- Genus: Tillandsia
- Subgenus: Tillandsia subg. Tillandsia
- Species: T. schultzei

Binomial name
- Tillandsia schultzei Harms

Species of plant

Tillandsia schultzei is a species of flowering plant in the genus Tillandsia. This species is native to Venezuela. The name of the species is given by Hermann August Theodor Harms. Tillandsia schultzei is an evergreen and the height of a perennial reach of 50 to 70 centimeters.
