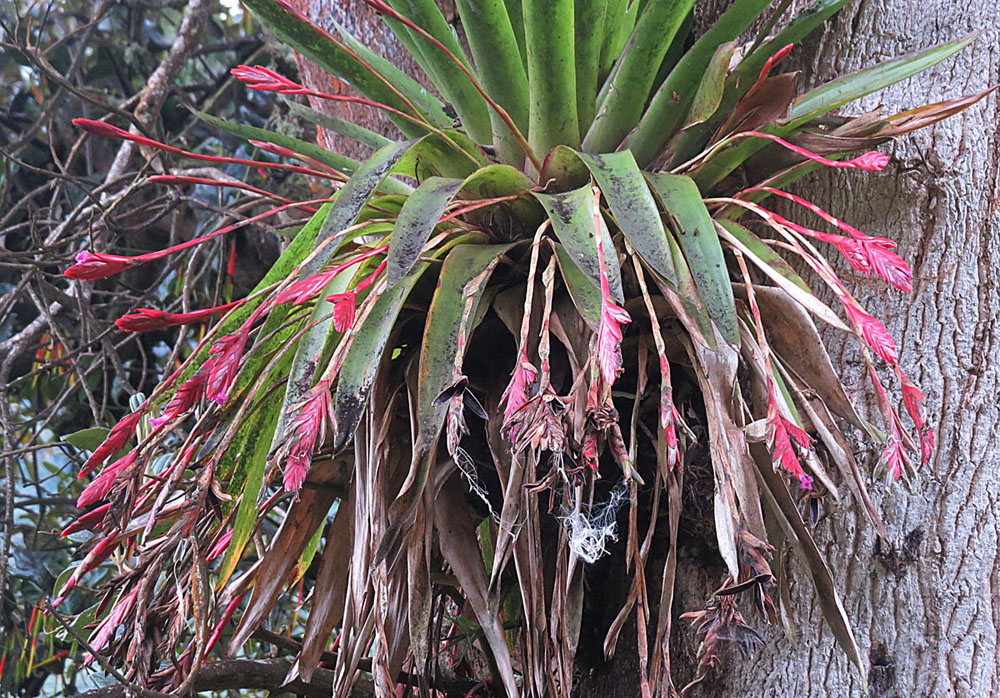

Scientific classification
- Kingdom: Plantae
- Clade: Tracheophytes
- Clade: Angiosperms
- Clade: Monocots
- Clade: Commelinids
- Order: Poales
- Family: Bromeliaceae
- Genus: Tillandsia
- Subgenus: Tillandsia subg. Tillandsia
- Species: T. complanata

Binomial name
- Tillandsia complanata Bentham

Synonyms
- Platystachys complanata (Benth.) E.Morren; Tillandsia axillaris Griseb.; Tillandsia complanata subsp. latifolia Gilmartin

= Tillandsia complanata =

Species of plant

Tillandsia complanata is a species of flowering plant in the genus Tillandsia. This species is native to Bolivia, Peru, northern Brazil, Colombia, Guyana, Costa Rica, Panama, Cuba, Jamaica, Trinidad, Venezuela and Ecuador.
