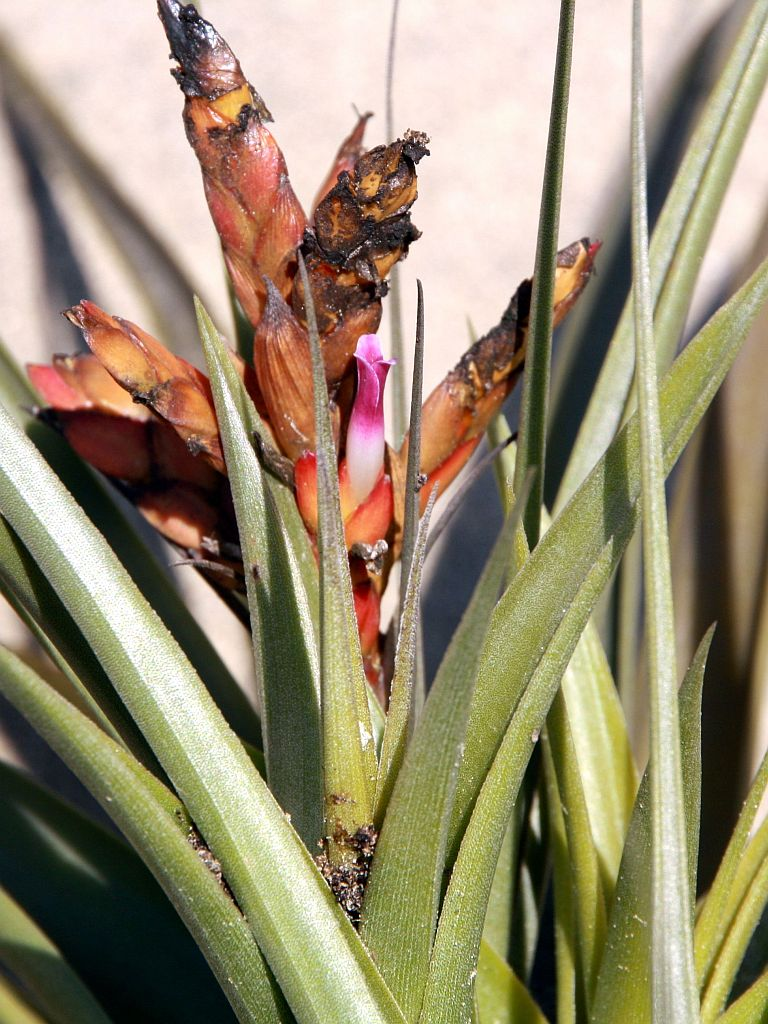

Scientific classification
- Kingdom: Plantae
- Clade: Tracheophytes
- Clade: Angiosperms
- Clade: Monocots
- Clade: Commelinids
- Order: Poales
- Family: Bromeliaceae
- Genus: Tillandsia
- Subgenus: Tillandsia subg. Tillandsia
- Species: T. latifolia

Binomial name
- Tillandsia latifolia Meyen

Synonyms
- Platystachys latifolia (Meyen) K.Koch; Tillandsia divaricata Benth; Tillandsia minor Mez & Sodiro; Tillandsia kunthiana Gaudich.; Platystachys kunthiana (Gaudich.) Beer; Tillandsia grisea Baker; Tillandsia oxysepala Baker; Tillandsia gayi Baker; Tillandsia murorum Mez

= Tillandsia latifolia =

Species of plant

Tillandsia latifolia is a species of flowering plant in the genus Tillandsia. This species is native to Ecuador and Peru. Four varieties are recognized:

1. Tillandsia latifolia var. divaricata (Benth.) Mez – Peru, Ecuador
2. Tillandsia latifolia var. latifolia – Peru, Ecuador
3. Tillandsia latifolia var. leucophylla Rauh – Peru
4. Tillandsia latifolia var. major Mez – Peru

== Cultivars ==
- Tillandsia 'Black Feather'
- Tillandsia 'Cajatambo'
- Tillandsia 'Canta'
- Tillandsia 'Delgado'
- Tillandsia 'Graffiti'
- Tillandsia 'Tom Thumb'
