= Tillandsia ionochroma =

Scientific classification
- Kingdom: Plantae
- Clade: Embryophytes
- Clade: Tracheophytes
- Clade: Spermatophytes
- Clade: Angiosperms
- Clade: Monocots
- Clade: Commelinids
- Order: Poales
- Family: Bromeliaceae
- Genus: Tillandsia
- Subgenus: Tillandsia subg. Tillandsia
- Species: T. ionochroma

Binomial name
- Tillandsia ionochroma André ex Mez

Synonyms
- Homotypic Synonyms: Caraguata violacea André; Heterotypic Synonyms: Tillandsia fuscoguttata Mez; Tillandsia wangerinii Mez

Species of plant

Tillandsia ionochroma is a species of flowering plant in the family Bromeliaceae. This species is native to Bolivia, Peru, Venezuela, and Ecuador.
