= Tillandsia compacta =

Scientific classification
- Kingdom: Plantae
- Clade: Tracheophytes
- Clade: Angiosperms
- Clade: Monocots
- Clade: Commelinids
- Order: Poales
- Family: Bromeliaceae
- Genus: Tillandsia
- Subgenus: Tillandsia subg. Tillandsia
- Species: T. compacta

Binomial name
- Tillandsia compacta Griseb.

Synonyms
- Tillandsia brunonis André; Tillandsia brunonis var. mutabilis André; Tillandsia caracasana Baker; Tillandsia compacta var. intermedia L.B.Sm.

Species of plant

Tillandsia compacta is a species of flowering plant in the family Bromeliaceae. This species is native to Cuba, Hispaniola, Colombia, Bolivia, Venezuela and Ecuador.
