= Tillandsia emergens =

Conservation status
- Vulnerable (IUCN 3.1)

Scientific classification
- Kingdom: Plantae
- Clade: Embryophytes
- Clade: Tracheophytes
- Clade: Spermatophytes
- Clade: Angiosperms
- Clade: Monocots
- Clade: Commelinids
- Order: Poales
- Family: Bromeliaceae
- Genus: Tillandsia
- Subgenus: Tillandsia subg. Tillandsia
- Species: T. emergens

Binomial name
- Tillandsia emergens Mez & Sodiro

Species of flowering plant

Tillandsia emergens is a species of flowering plant in the family Bromeliaceae. It is endemic to Ecuador. Its natural habitat is the Andean region at 2,500–4,000 metres (8,200–13,100 ft). It is threatened by habitat loss.
