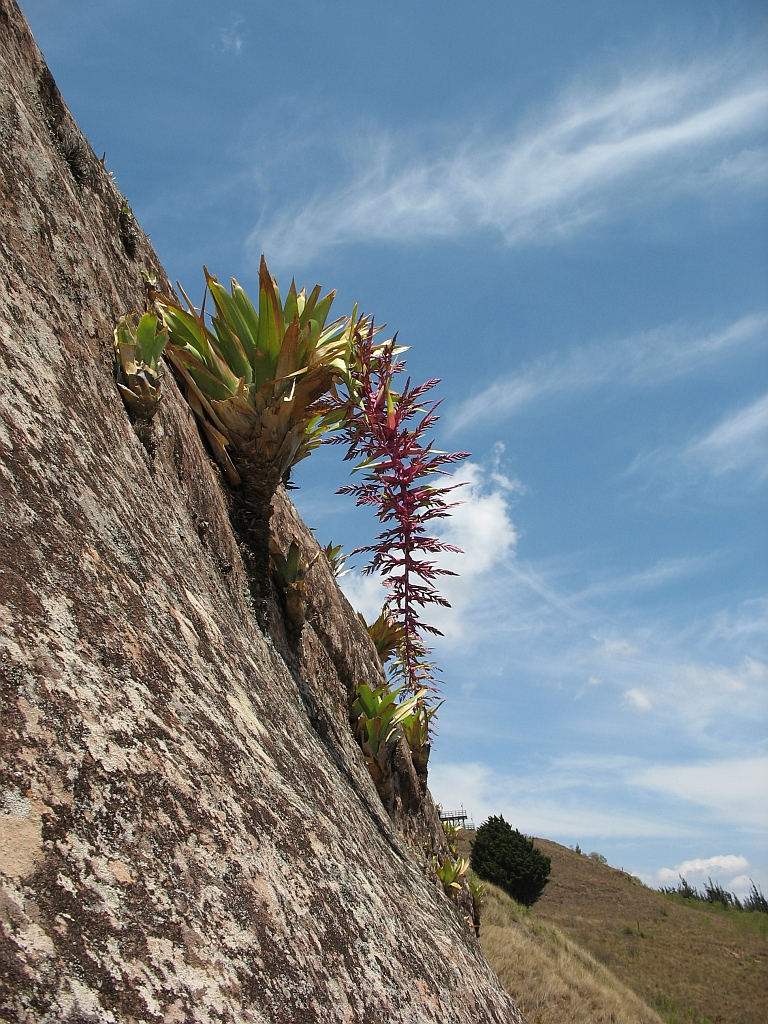

Scientific classification
- Kingdom: Plantae
- Clade: Embryophytes
- Clade: Tracheophytes
- Clade: Spermatophytes
- Clade: Angiosperms
- Clade: Monocots
- Clade: Commelinids
- Order: Poales
- Family: Bromeliaceae
- Genus: Tillandsia
- Subgenus: Tillandsia subg. Tillandsia
- Species: T. australis

Binomial name
- Tillandsia australis Mez

Synonyms
- Heterotypic Synonyms: Tillandsia maxima Lillo & Hauman; Tillandsia maxima var. densior L.B.Sm.

= Tillandsia australis =

Species of plant

Tillandsia australis is a species of flowering plant in the family Bromeliaceae. This species is native to Bolivia.

== Taxonomy ==
=== Cultivars ===
Recognized cultivars include:

- × Vrieslandsia 'Arden's Fireworks'
- × Vrieslandsia 'Twin Brother'
