= Tillandsia adpressiflora =

Scientific classification
- Kingdom: Plantae
- Clade: Embryophytes
- Clade: Tracheophytes
- Clade: Spermatophytes
- Clade: Angiosperms
- Clade: Monocots
- Clade: Commelinids
- Order: Poales
- Family: Bromeliaceae
- Genus: Tillandsia
- Subgenus: Tillandsia subg. Tillandsia
- Species: T. adpressiflora

Binomial name
- Tillandsia adpressiflora Mez

Species of plant

Tillandsia adpressiflora is a species of flowering plant in the family Bromeliaceae. This species is native to Bolivia, Venezuela, Colombia, Ecuador, Peru, French Guiana, and northern Brazil.
