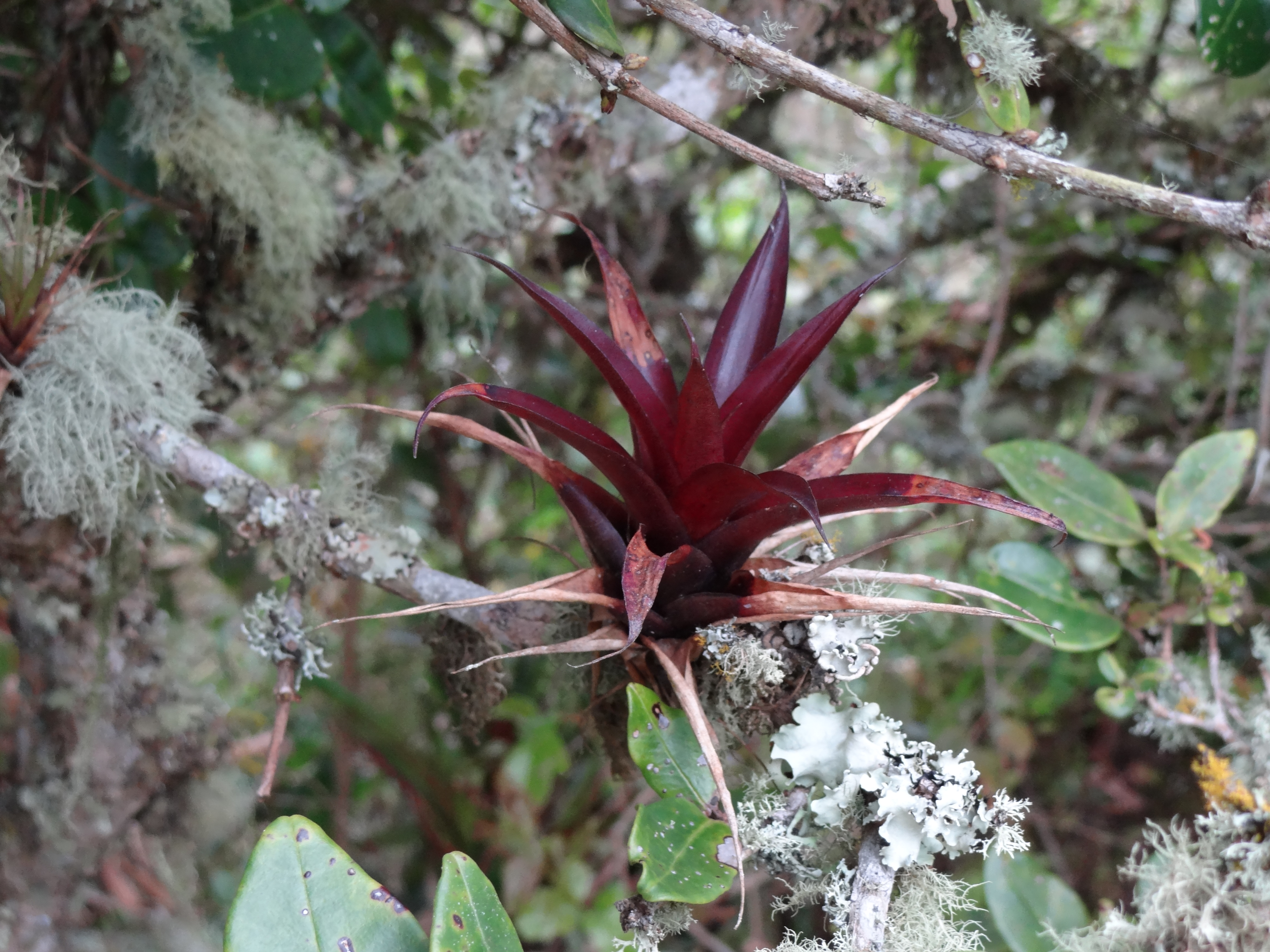

Scientific classification
- Kingdom: Plantae
- Clade: Embryophytes
- Clade: Tracheophytes
- Clade: Spermatophytes
- Clade: Angiosperms
- Clade: Monocots
- Clade: Commelinids
- Order: Poales
- Family: Bromeliaceae
- Genus: Tillandsia
- Subgenus: Tillandsia subg. Tillandsia
- Species: T. tovarensis

Binomial name
- Tillandsia tovarensis Mez

Synonyms
- Heterotypic Synonyms: Tillandsia arnoldiana Harms

= Tillandsia tovarensis =

Species of epiphyte

Tillandsia tovarensis is a species of flowering plant in the family Bromeliaceae. This species is native to Bolivia, Colombia, Peru, Venezuela and Ecuador.
