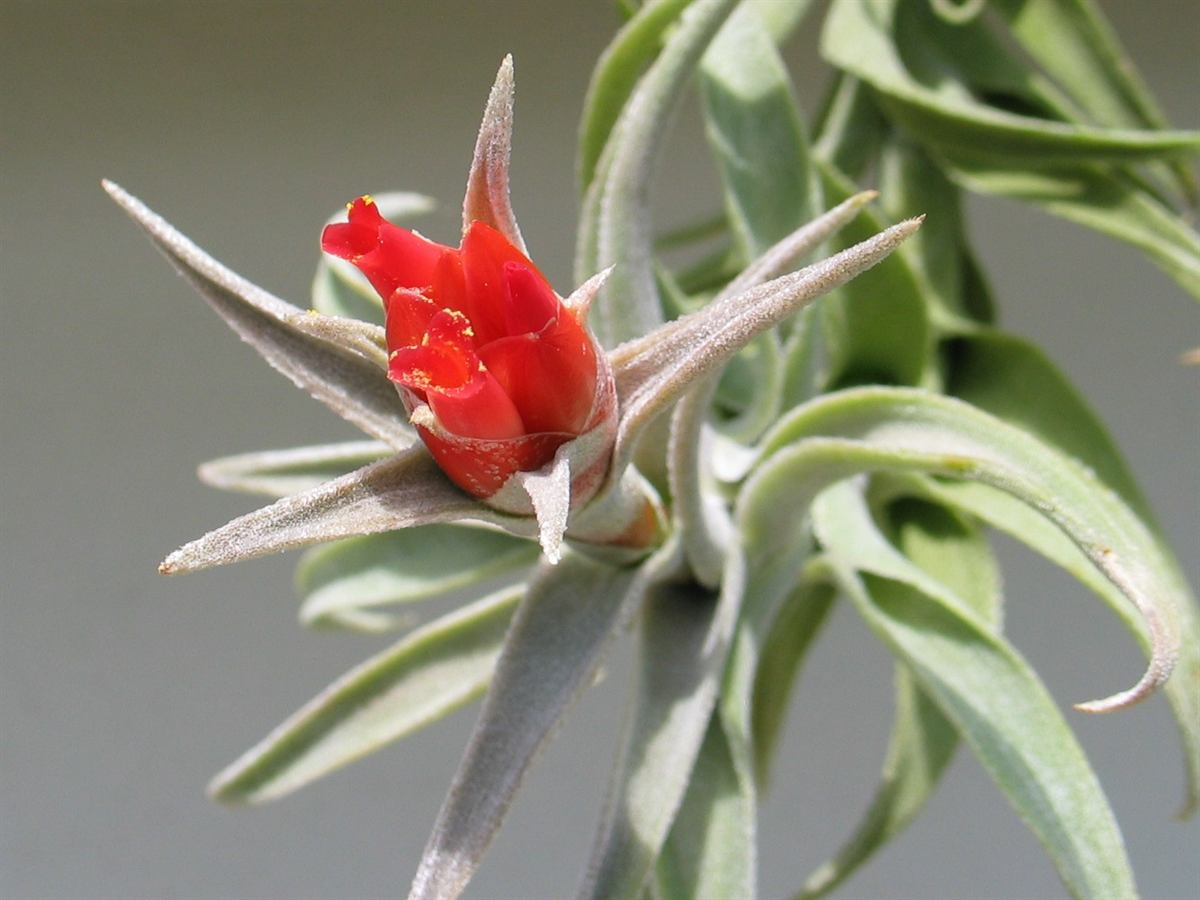

Scientific classification
- Kingdom: Plantae
- Clade: Tracheophytes
- Clade: Angiosperms
- Clade: Monocots
- Clade: Commelinids
- Order: Poales
- Family: Bromeliaceae
- Genus: Tillandsia
- Subgenus: Tillandsia subg. Tillandsia
- Species: T. edithae

Binomial name
- Tillandsia edithae Rauh

= Tillandsia edithae =

Species of plant

Tillandsia edithae is a cliff dwelling caulescent species from Bolivia which has a beautiful red flowered inflorescence when in bud. Tillandsia edithae is one of the few tillandsias to have coral coloured flowers. It produces a lot of adventitious offsets along the base of the stem. These flowers are quite rare.

== Description ==
Tillandsia edithae produces "pups" at the base and along the stem. These flowers have crimson red blooms and quick growing roots. They have alternating stiff or leathery strap-shaped leaves. Leaf colour varies from silver to shades of green blushed with other bright colours. Leaf texture is soft or ridged and leaves are covered in scales or hairs (trichomes) that collect water and nutrients for the plant.

== Cultivars ==
- Tillandsia 'Lisa's Jewell'
- Tillandsia 'Peach Parfait'
