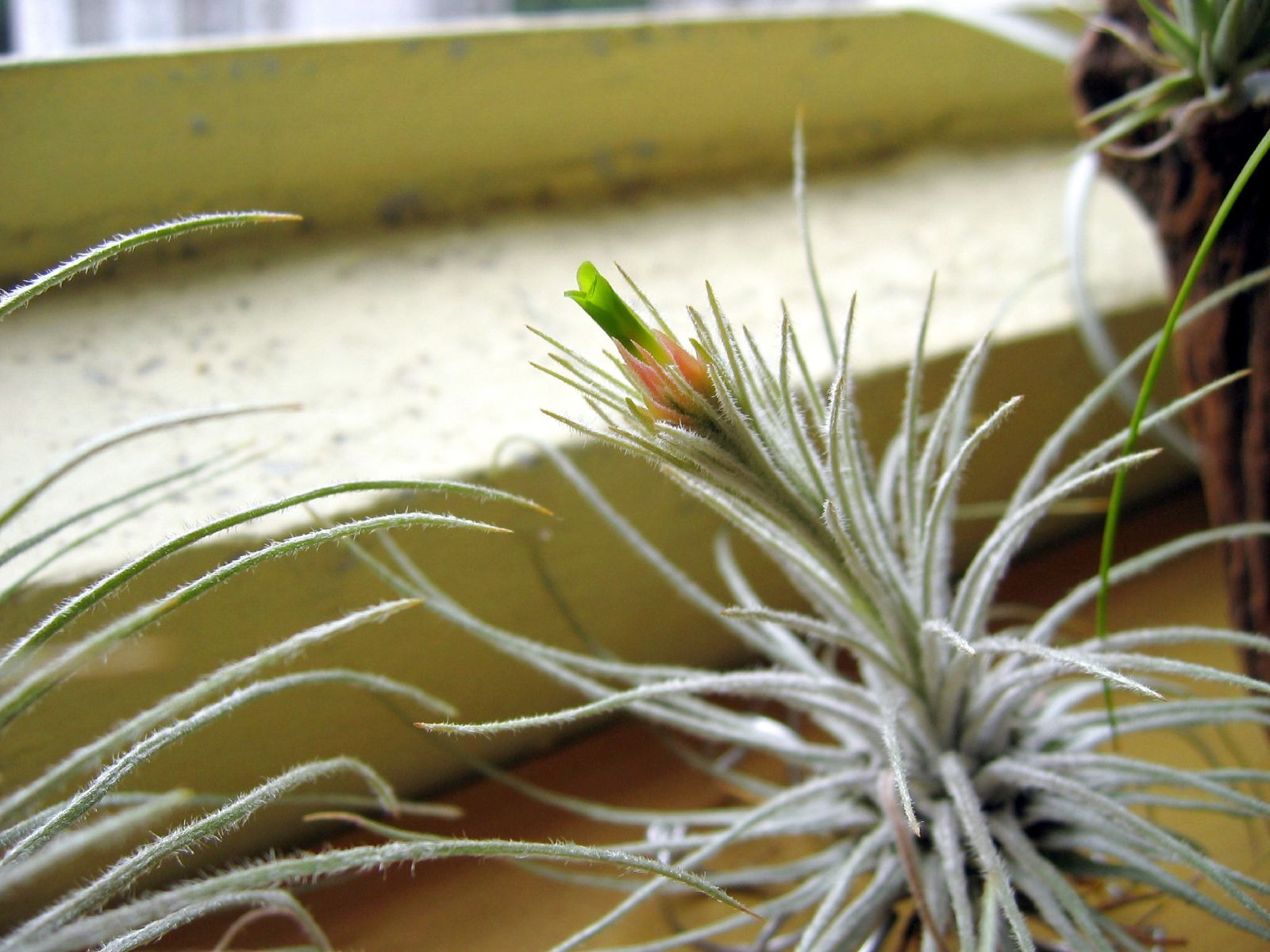

Scientific classification
- Kingdom: Plantae
- Clade: Tracheophytes
- Clade: Angiosperms
- Clade: Monocots
- Clade: Commelinids
- Order: Poales
- Family: Bromeliaceae
- Genus: Tillandsia
- Subgenus: Tillandsia subg. Viridantha
- Species: T. plumosa

Binomial name
- Tillandsia plumosa Baker

Synonyms
- Viridantha plumosa (Baker) Espejo

= Tillandsia plumosa =

Species of plant

Tillandsia plumosa is a species of flowering plant in the family Bromeliaceae. This species is native to Mexico.
