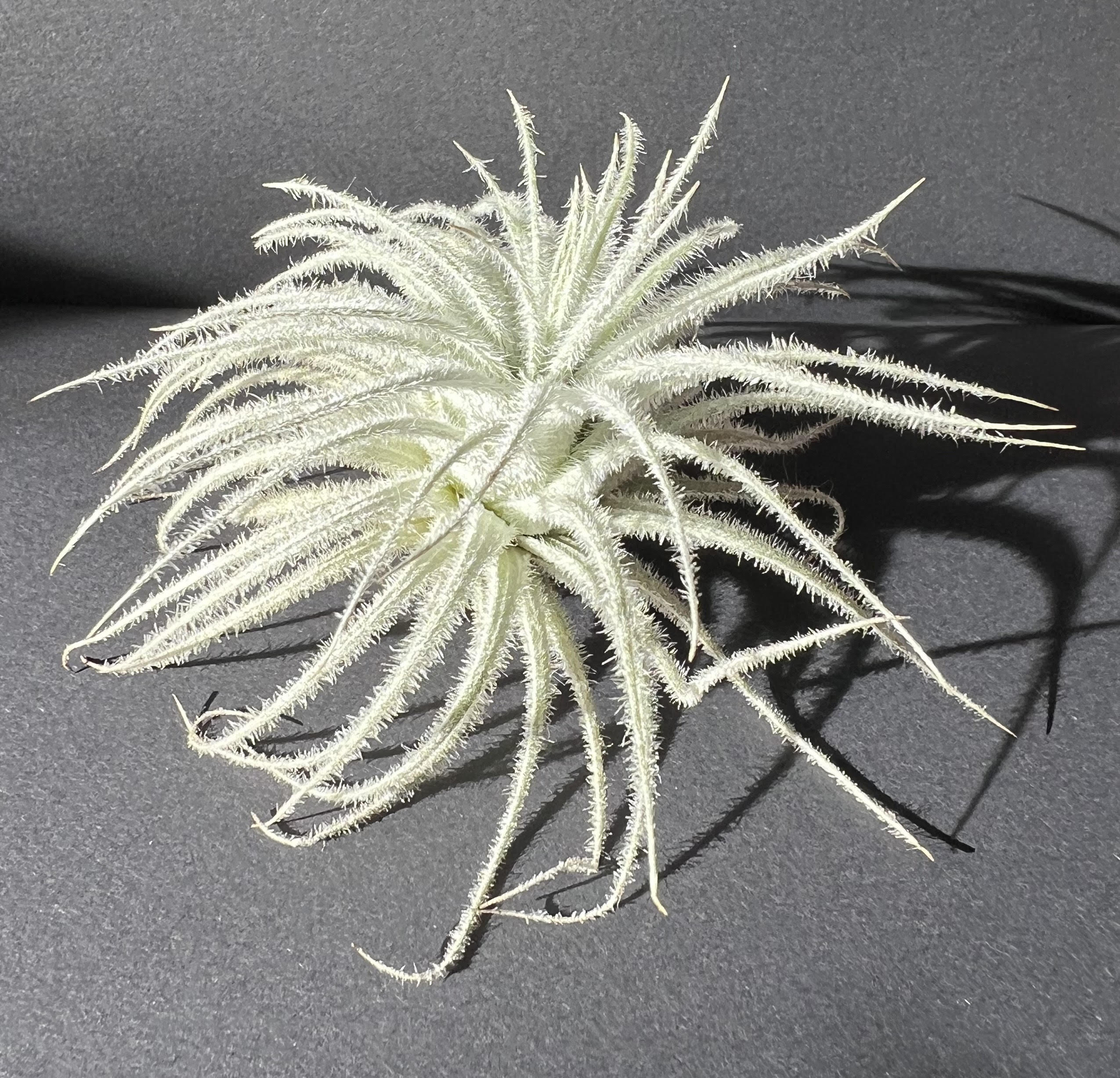

Scientific classification
- Kingdom: Plantae
- Clade: Tracheophytes
- Clade: Angiosperms
- Clade: Monocots
- Clade: Commelinids
- Order: Poales
- Family: Bromeliaceae
- Genus: Tillandsia
- Subgenus: Tillandsia subg. Viridantha
- Species: T. tectorum

Binomial name
- Tillandsia tectorum E.Morren

Synonyms
- Tillandsia argentea K.Koch & Verschaff. 1868, illegitimate homonym, not Griseb. 1866; Tillandsia rupicola Baker; Tillandsia saxicola Mez; Tillandsia tectorum f. gigantea L.Hrom.; Tillandsia tectorum var. globosa L.Hrom.; Tillandsia tectorum var. viridula L.Hrom.

= Tillandsia tectorum =

Species of plant

Tillandsia tectorum is a species of flowering plant in the genus Tillandsia. It is native to Peru and Ecuador. It is the only species of Tillandsia native to Ecuador.

The leaves have dense trichomes covering the entire plant. It is often said that this is to absorb water better in the cloudy Ecuadorian forests, but their true function is the opposite. The trichomes provide a surface for more rapid evaporation. T. tectorum grows in areas with strong winds, thick fogs, heavy rain, and moments of bright light as clouds move away. Without a large surface area for evaporation and the light-scattering properties of the trichomes, the plant would be suffocated from the humidity and scalded by the intense sunlight.

== Cultivars ==
- Tillandsia 'Enano'
- Tillandsia 'Sweet Isabel'
