= Tillandsia ignesiae =

Scientific classification
- Kingdom: Plantae
- Clade: Embryophytes
- Clade: Tracheophytes
- Clade: Spermatophytes
- Clade: Angiosperms
- Clade: Monocots
- Clade: Commelinids
- Order: Poales
- Family: Bromeliaceae
- Genus: Tillandsia
- Subgenus: Tillandsia subg. Viridantha
- Species: T. ignesiae

Binomial name
- Tillandsia ignesiae Mez

Synonyms
- Homotypic Synonyms: Viridantha ignesiae (Mez) Espejo; Heterotypic Synonyms: Tillandsia lecomtei Poiss. & Menet

Species of plant

Tillandsia ignesiae is a species of flowering plant in the family Bromeliaceae. This species is native to Mexico.
