= Tillandsia helmutii =

Scientific classification
- Kingdom: Plantae
- Clade: Tracheophytes
- Clade: Angiosperms
- Clade: Monocots
- Clade: Commelinids
- Order: Poales
- Family: Bromeliaceae
- Genus: Tillandsia
- Subgenus: Tillandsia subg. Aerobia
- Species: T. helmutii

Binomial name
- Tillandsia helmutii L.Hrom.

Species of plant

Tillandsia helmutii is a species of flowering plant in the genus Tillandsia. This species is endemic to the flood plains of the Río Chico in Chuquisaca, Bolivia at elevations of around 1800m.

== Description ==
In the wild, Tillandsia helmutii grows as a lithophyte. It grows as a rosette, sometimes with multiple branches. on mature plants, the leaves are each 20-30cm long and are Densely polystichous. leaves closer to the growing point are fully erect while closer to the outside of the plant, they droop slightly outwards.
