= Tillandsia clavigera =

Scientific classification
- Kingdom: Plantae
- Clade: Embryophytes
- Clade: Tracheophytes
- Clade: Spermatophytes
- Clade: Angiosperms
- Clade: Monocots
- Clade: Commelinids
- Order: Poales
- Family: Bromeliaceae
- Genus: Tillandsia
- Subgenus: Tillandsia subg. Tillandsia
- Species: T. clavigera

Binomial name
- Tillandsia clavigera Mez

Synonyms
- Homotypic Synonyms: Tillandsia deppeana var. clavigera (Mez) L.B.Sm.

Species of plant

Tillandsia clavigera is a species of flowering plant in the family Bromeliaceae. This species is native to Venezuela, Colombia, Peru, and Ecuador.
