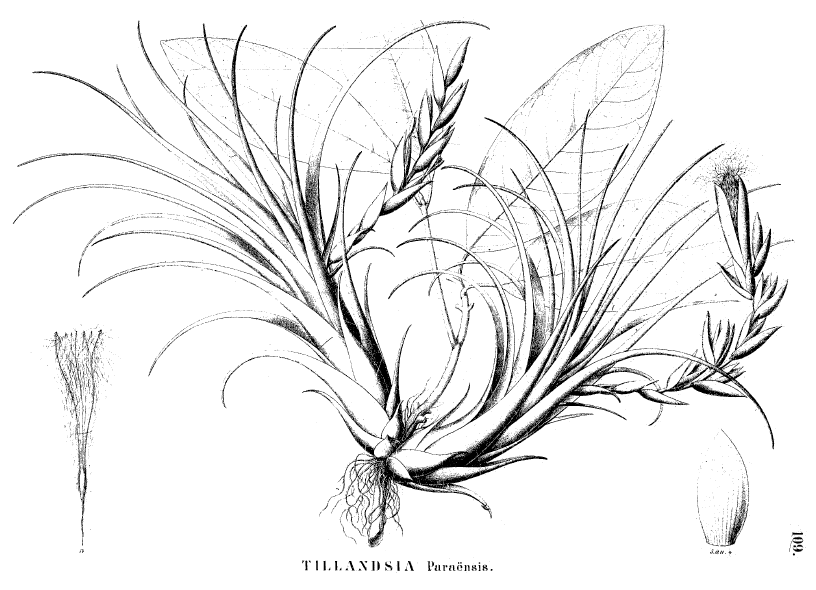

Scientific classification
- Kingdom: Plantae
- Clade: Embryophytes
- Clade: Tracheophytes
- Clade: Spermatophytes
- Clade: Angiosperms
- Clade: Monocots
- Clade: Commelinids
- Order: Poales
- Family: Bromeliaceae
- Genus: Tillandsia
- Subgenus: Tillandsia subg. Tillandsia
- Species: T. paraensis

Binomial name
- Tillandsia paraensis Mez

Synonyms
- Heterotypic Synonyms: Tillandsia boliviensis Baker; Tillandsia juruana Ule; Tillandsia sanctae-crucis S.Moore; Vriesea sanctae-crucis S.Moore

= Tillandsia paraensis =

Species of plant

Tillandsia paraensis is a species of flowering plant in the family Bromeliaceae. This species is native to Bolivia, Peru, Ecuador, Colombia, the Guianas, Brazil and Venezuela.
