= Tillandsia floribunda =

Scientific classification
- Kingdom: Plantae
- Clade: Tracheophytes
- Clade: Angiosperms
- Clade: Monocots
- Clade: Commelinids
- Order: Poales
- Family: Bromeliaceae
- Genus: Tillandsia
- Subgenus: Tillandsia subg. Tillandsia
- Species: T. floribunda

Binomial name
- Tillandsia floribunda Kunth

Species of plant

Tillandsia floribunda is a species in the genus Tillandsia. This species is native to Ecuador.

== Cultivars ==
- Tillandsia 'Cataco'
