= Philodendron camposportoanum =

Scientific classification
- Kingdom: Plantae
- Clade: Tracheophytes
- Clade: Angiosperms
- Clade: Monocots
- Order: Alismatales
- Family: Araceae
- Genus: Philodendron
- Species: P. camposportoanum

Binomial name
- Philodendron camposportoanum G.M.Barroso

Species of plant

Philodendron camposportoanum is a species of flowering plant in the family Araceae. It is native to the wet tropics of South America. A terrestrial vine and facultative climber, its leaves are slightly velvety and are often blushed a brownish red color. As the leaves mature they develop upper lobes until they are nearly trifoliate.
