= Irwinia =

Irwinia is the scientific name of two genera of organisms and may refer to:

- Irwinia (fly), a genus of flies in the family Tachinidae, now treated as a taxonomic synonym of Phytomyptera
- Irwinia, a former genus of plants in the family Asteraceae, whose only species Irwinia coronata is now treated as Blanchetia coronata
