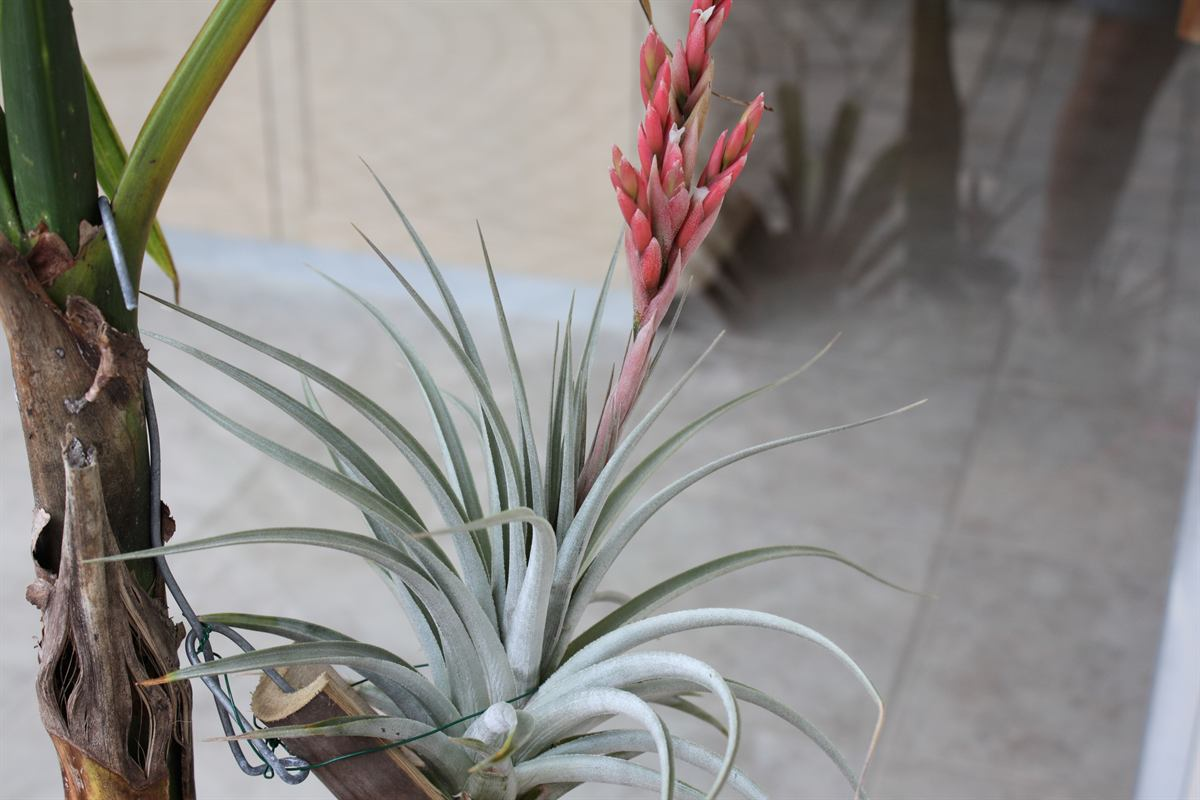

Scientific classification
- Kingdom: Plantae
- Clade: Tracheophytes
- Clade: Angiosperms
- Clade: Monocots
- Clade: Commelinids
- Order: Poales
- Family: Bromeliaceae
- Genus: Tillandsia
- Subgenus: Tillandsia subg. Anoplophytum
- Species: T. guelzii

Binomial name
- Tillandsia guelzii Rauh

= Tillandsia guelzii =

Species of plant

Tillandsia guelzii is a species in the genus Tillandsia. It is endemic to Jujuy Province of northern Argentina.
