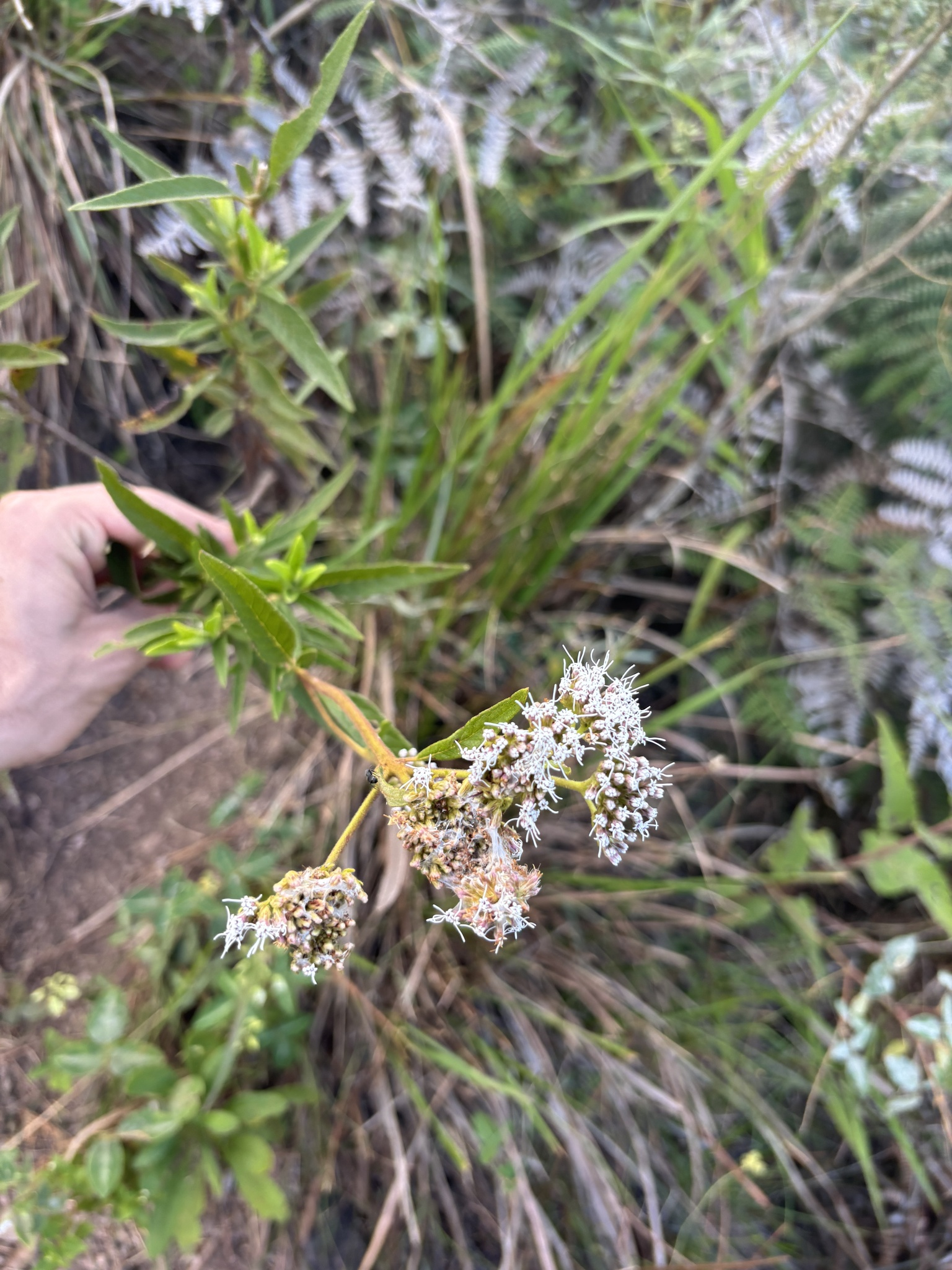
- Grazielia intermedia in Brazil

Scientific classification
- Kingdom: Plantae
- Clade: Embryophytes
- Clade: Tracheophytes
- Clade: Spermatophytes
- Clade: Angiosperms
- Clade: Eudicots
- Clade: Asterids
- Order: Asterales
- Family: Asteraceae
- Subfamily: Asteroideae
- Tribe: Eupatorieae
- Genus: Grazielia; R.M.King & H.Rob.

Synonyms
- Eupatorium section Dimorpholepis G.M.Barroso; Dimorpholepis (G.M.Barroso) R.M.King & H.Rob. 1971, illegitimate homonym, not A.Gray 1852

= Grazielia =

Genus of flowering plants

Grazielia is a genus of South American flowering plants in the family Asteraceae.

The genus is named for Brazilian botanist Graziela Maciel Barroso.

All the known species are native to Brazil. Grazielia intermedia occurs also in Paraguay, G. serrata also in Uruguay, Paraguay, and Argentina.

== Species ==
According to Global Compositae Checklist:

- Grazielia bishopii R.M.King & H.Rob.
- Grazielia dimorpholepis (Baker) R.M.King & H.Rob.
- Grazielia gaudichaudeana (DC.) R.M.King & H.Rob.
- Grazielia intermedia (DC.) R.M.King & H.Rob.
- Grazielia mollicoma (B.L.Rob.) R.M.King & H.Rob.
- Grazielia mollissima (Sch.Bip. ex Baker) R.M.King & H.Rob.
- Grazielia multifida (DC.) R.M.King & H.Rob.
- Grazielia nummularia (Hook. & Arn.) R.M.King & H.Rob.
- Grazielia schultzii R.M.King & H.Rob.
- Grazielia serrata (Spreng.) R.M.King & H.Rob.

Kew also lists:

- Grazielia brevipetiolata (Sch.Bip. ex Baker) R.M.King & H.Rob.
- Grazielia coriacea (R.M.King & H.Rob.) R.M.King & H.Rob.
