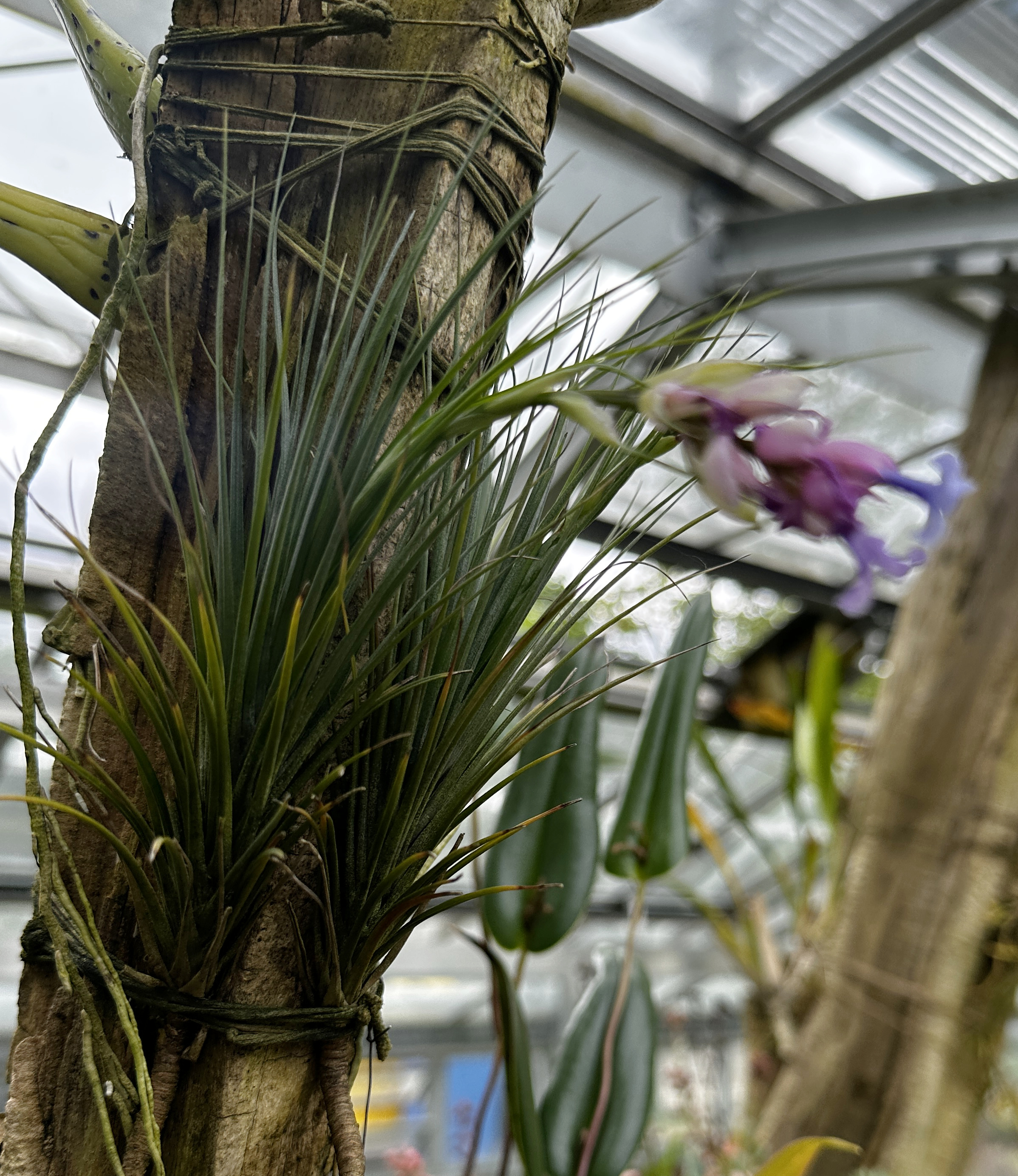
- Tillandsia montana in the Gruson greenhouses in Magdeburg

Scientific classification
- Kingdom: Plantae
- Clade: Embryophytes
- Clade: Tracheophytes
- Clade: Spermatophytes
- Clade: Angiosperms
- Clade: Monocots
- Clade: Commelinids
- Order: Poales
- Family: Bromeliaceae
- Genus: Tillandsia
- Subgenus: Tillandsia subg. Anoplophytum
- Species: T. montana

Binomial name
- Tillandsia montana Reitz

= Tillandsia montana =

Species of flowering plant

Tillandsia montana is a species of plant in the genus Tillandsia. This species is endemic to Brazil. The Latin specific epithet montana refers to mountains or coming from mountains.
