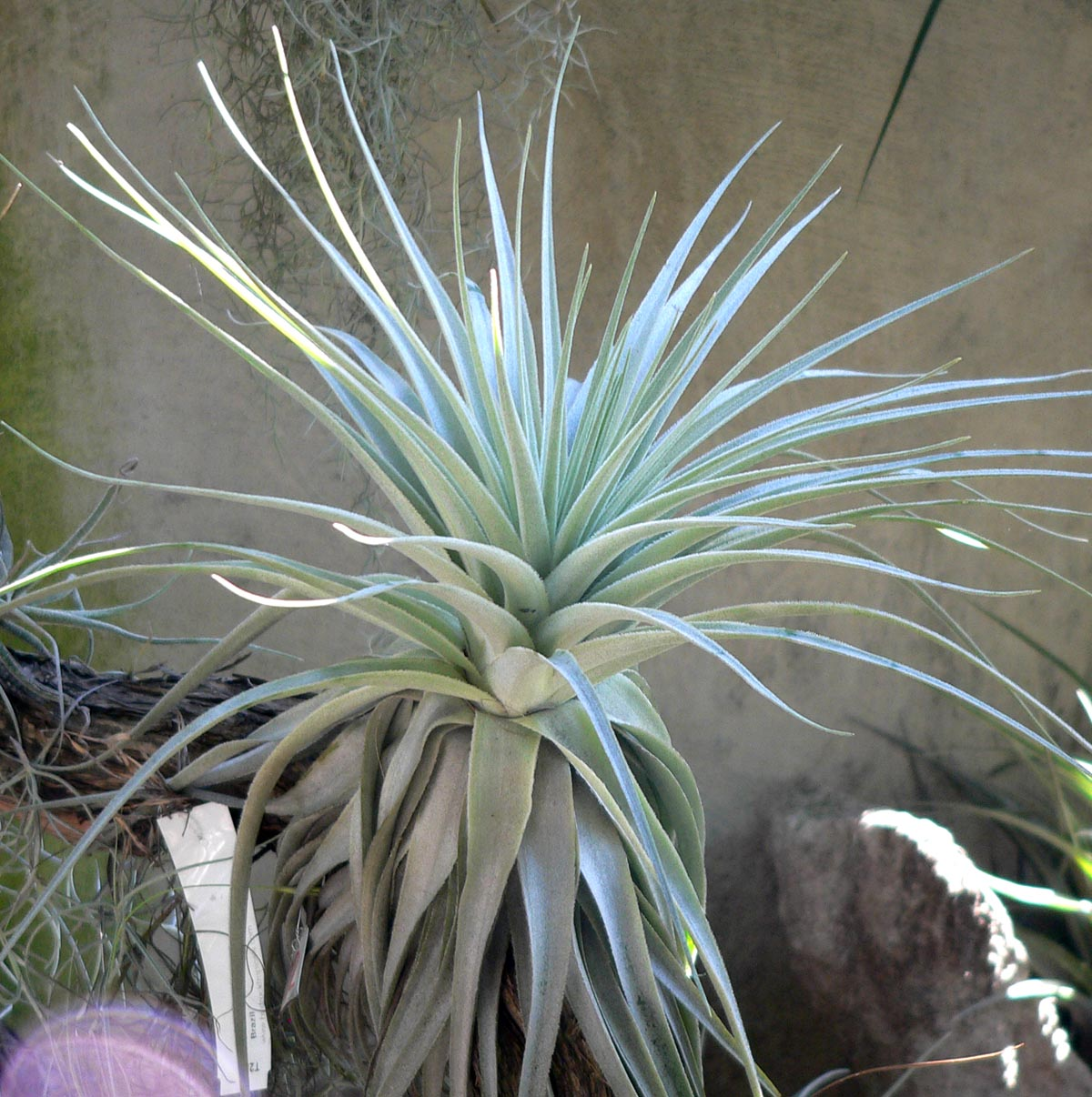
- Tillandsia gardneri var. gardneri

Scientific classification
- Kingdom: Plantae
- Clade: Tracheophytes
- Clade: Angiosperms
- Clade: Monocots
- Clade: Commelinids
- Order: Poales
- Family: Bromeliaceae
- Genus: Tillandsia
- Subgenus: Tillandsia subg. Anoplophytum
- Species: T. gardneri

Binomial name
- Tillandsia gardneri Lindl.

Synonyms
- Anoplophytum rollissonii E.Morren ex C.Morren; Anoplophytum incanum E.Morren ex C.Morren; Tillandsia fluminensis Mez; Tillandsia regnellii Mez; Tillandsia cambuquirensis Silveira; Tillandsia venusta Silveira (1931), not Mez & Wercklé (1905)

= Tillandsia gardneri =

Southern America plant

Tillandsia gardneri is a species in the genus Tillandsia. This species is native to Trinidad and Tobago, Colombia, eastern Brazil (as far south as Rio Grande do Sul) and Venezuela.

== Cultivars ==
- Tillandsia 'Feather Duster'
- Tillandsia 'Gardicta'
- Tillandsia 'Quicksilver'
- Tillandsia 'Tropic Skye'
