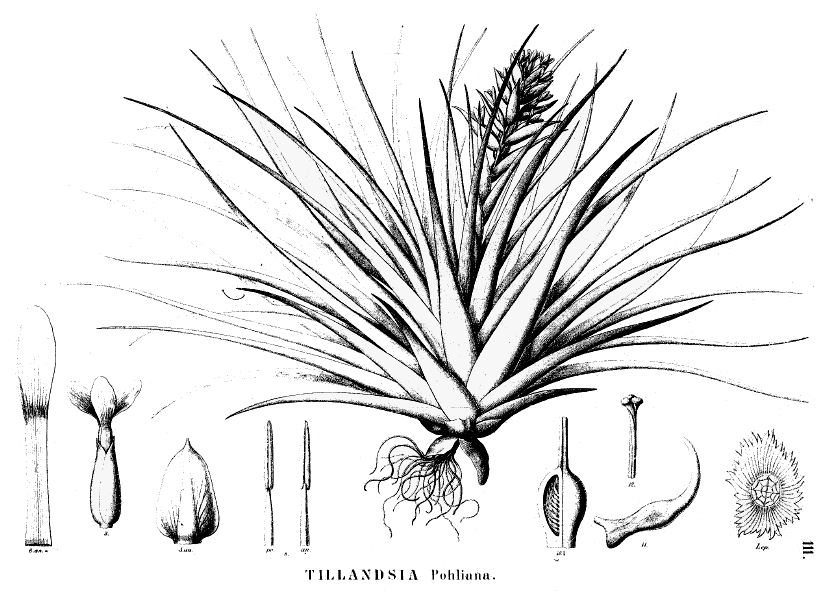

Scientific classification
- Kingdom: Plantae
- Clade: Embryophytes
- Clade: Tracheophytes
- Clade: Spermatophytes
- Clade: Angiosperms
- Clade: Monocots
- Clade: Commelinids
- Order: Poales
- Family: Bromeliaceae
- Genus: Tillandsia
- Subgenus: Tillandsia subg. Anoplophytum
- Species: T. pohliana

Binomial name
- Tillandsia pohliana Mez

Synonyms
- Heterotypic Synonyms: Tillandsia hilaireana Baker; Tillandsia latisepala L.B.Sm.; Tillandsia windhausenii Hassl. ex Rojas

= Tillandsia pohliana =

Species of plant

Tillandsia pohliana is a species of flowering plant in the family Bromeliaceae. This species is native to Bolivia, Peru, Argentina, Paraguay, and Brazil.
