= Tillandsia grazielae =

Scientific classification
- Kingdom: Plantae
- Clade: Tracheophytes
- Clade: Angiosperms
- Clade: Monocots
- Clade: Commelinids
- Order: Poales
- Family: Bromeliaceae
- Genus: Tillandsia
- Subgenus: Tillandsia subg. Anoplophytum
- Species: T. grazielae

Binomial name
- Tillandsia grazielae Sucre & Braga

Species of plant

Tillandsia grazielae is a species in the genus Tillandsia. This species is endemic to Brazil. It was named after the botanist Graziela Maciel Barroso.
