= Blanchetia heterotricha =

Scientific classification
- Kingdom: Plantae
- Clade: Tracheophytes
- Clade: Angiosperms
- Clade: Eudicots
- Clade: Asterids
- Order: Asterales
- Family: Asteraceae
- Genus: Blanchetia
- Species: B. heterotricha

Binomial name
- Blanchetia heterotricha DC.

Species of plant

Blanchetia heterotricha is a species of flowering plant in the family Asteraceae, endemic to Northeast Brazil. It was first described by Augustin Pyramus de Candolle in 1836.
