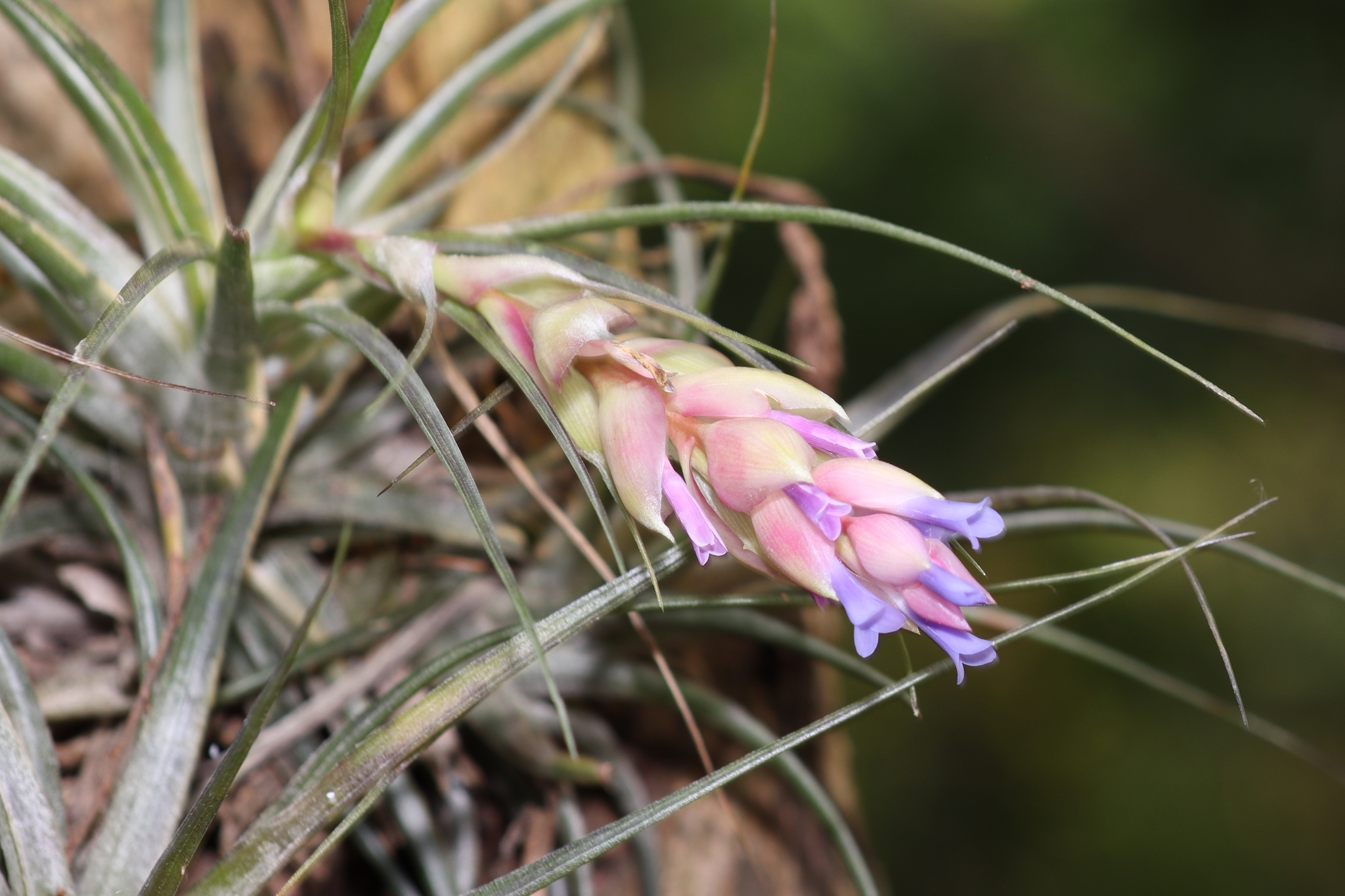

Scientific classification
- Kingdom: Plantae
- Clade: Embryophytes
- Clade: Tracheophytes
- Clade: Spermatophytes
- Clade: Angiosperms
- Clade: Monocots
- Clade: Commelinids
- Order: Poales
- Family: Bromeliaceae
- Genus: Tillandsia
- Subgenus: Tillandsia subg. Anoplophytum
- Species: T. stricta

Binomial name
- Tillandsia stricta Solander

= Tillandsia stricta =

Species of plant

Tillandsia stricta is a species in the genus Tillandsia. This species is native to South America and Trinidad.

Two varieties are recognized:

1. Tillandsia stricta var. disticha L.B.Sm - State of Paraná in Brazil
2. Tillandsia stricta var. stricta - Trinidad, Guyana, Suriname, Venezuela, Brazil, Bolivia, Paraguay, Uruguay, Argentina

== Cultivars ==
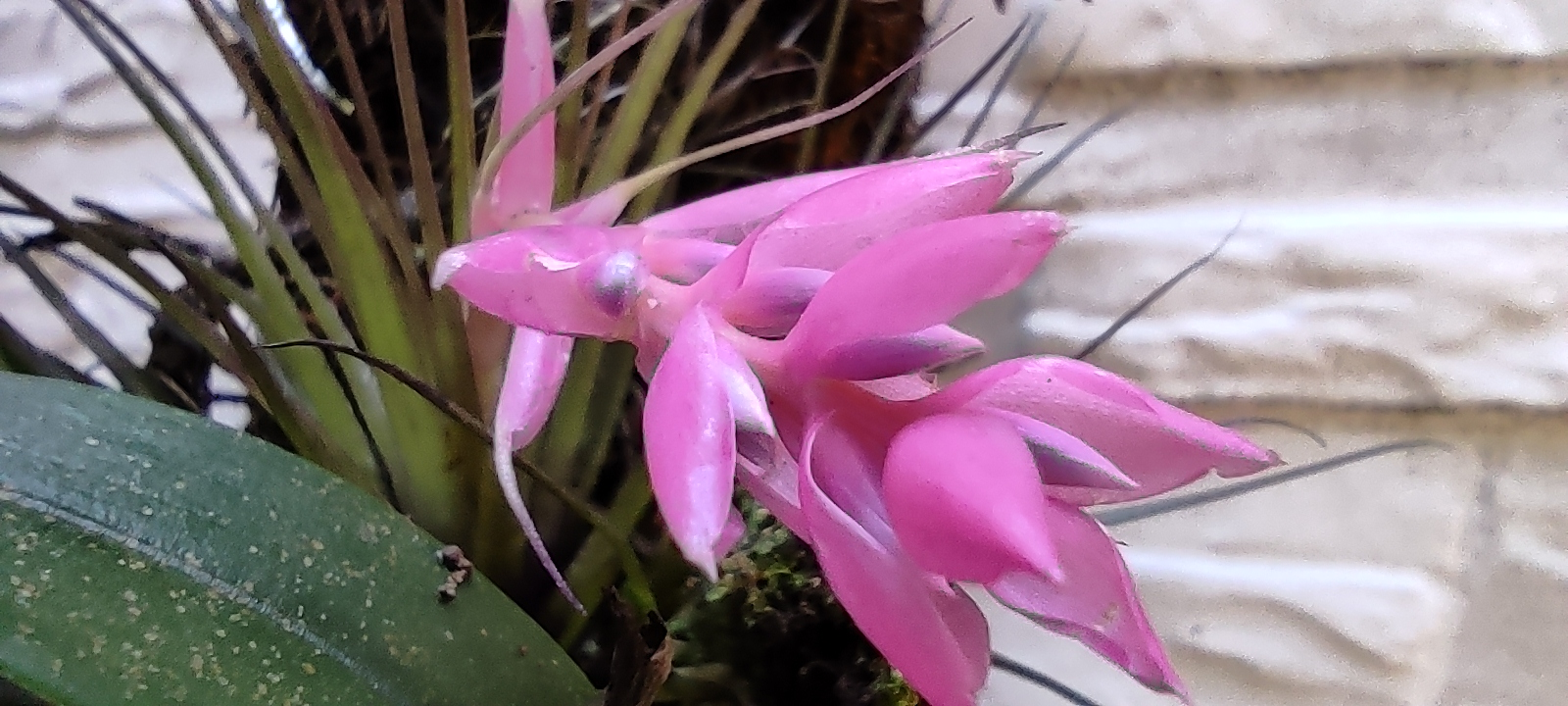
Brazilian pink-flowered Tillandsia stricta

- Tillandsia 'Azure Flame'
- Tillandsia 'Bingo'
- Tillandsia 'Bushfire'
- Tillandsia 'Coconut Ice'
- Tillandsia 'Cooran'
- Tillandsia 'Cooroy'
- Tillandsia 'Cotton Candy'
- Tillandsia 'Feather Duster'
- Tillandsia 'Fire And Ice'
- Tillandsia 'Flaming Cascade'
- Tillandsia 'Flaming Spire'
- Tillandsia 'Gardicta'
- Tillandsia 'Houston'
- Tillandsia 'Imbroglio'
- Tillandsia 'J. R.'
- Tillandsia 'Kayjay'
- Tillandsia 'Lilac Spire'
- Tillandsia 'Millenium'
- Tillandsia 'Mystic Albert'
- Tillandsia 'Ned Kelly'
- Tillandsia 'Perky Pink'
- Tillandsia 'Poor Ixy'
- Tillandsia 'Quicksilver'
- Tillandsia 'Really Red'
- Tillandsia 'Rolly Reilly'
- Tillandsia 'Sexton'
- Tillandsia 'Southern Cross'
- Tillandsia 'Tamaree'
- Tillandsia 'Ty's Prize'
- Tillandsia 'Winner's Circle'
