= Tillandsia leonamiana =

Scientific classification
- Kingdom: Plantae
- Clade: Tracheophytes
- Clade: Angiosperms
- Clade: Monocots
- Clade: Commelinids
- Order: Poales
- Family: Bromeliaceae
- Genus: Tillandsia
- Subgenus: Tillandsia subg. Anoplophytum
- Species: T. leonamiana

Binomial name
- Tillandsia leonamiana E.Pereira

Species of plant

Tillandsia leonamiana is a species in the genus Tillandsia. This species is native to Brazil.

== Cultivars ==
- Tillandsia 'Ed Doherty'
- Tillandsia 'Mariposa'
