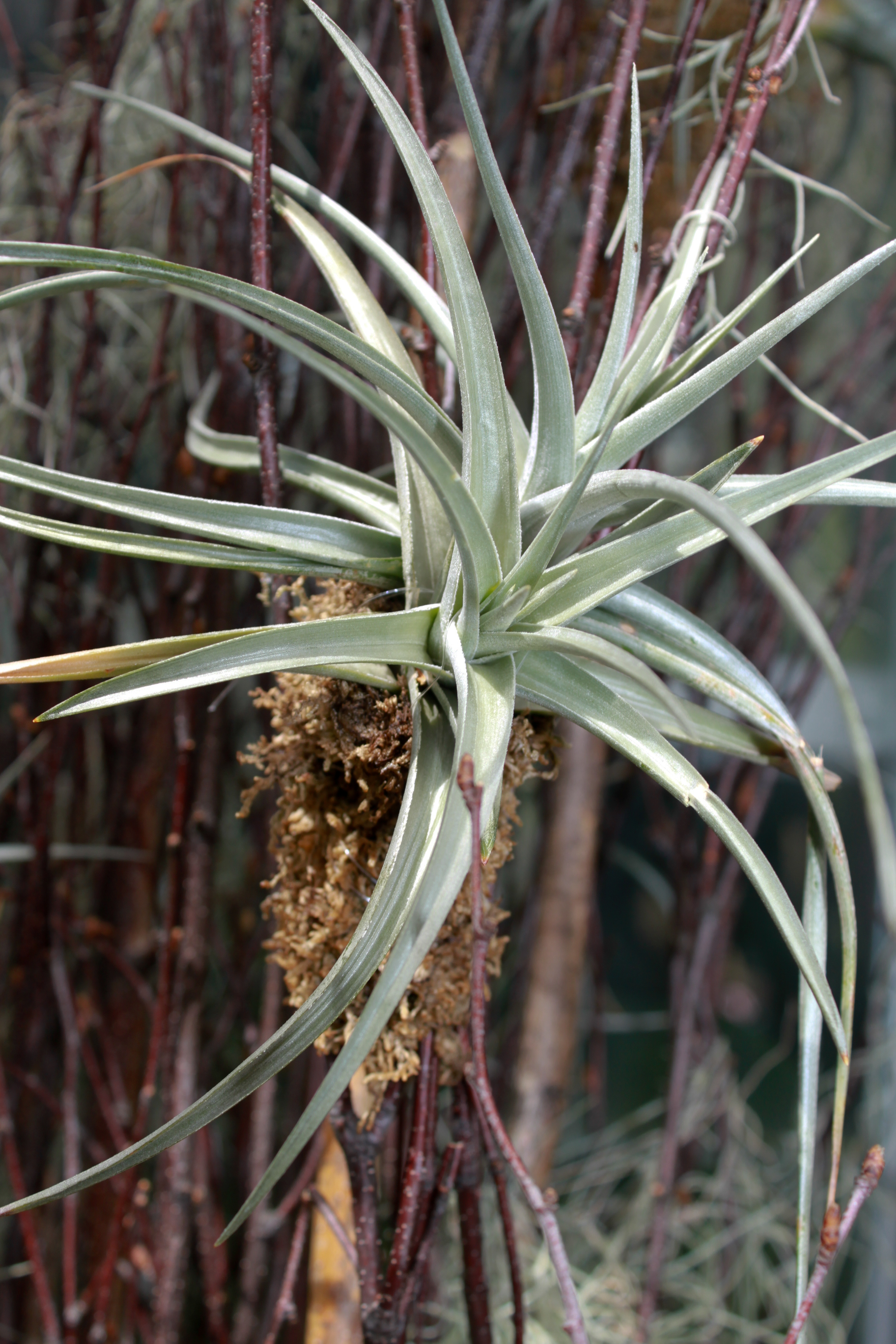

Scientific classification
- Kingdom: Plantae
- Clade: Tracheophytes
- Clade: Angiosperms
- Clade: Monocots
- Clade: Commelinids
- Order: Poales
- Family: Bromeliaceae
- Genus: Tillandsia
- Subgenus: Tillandsia subg. Anoplophytum
- Species: T. jucunda

Binomial name
- Tillandsia jucunda Castellanos

= Tillandsia jucunda =

Species of plant

Tillandsia jucunda is a species in the genus Tillandsia. This species is native to Argentina and Bolivia.

== Cultivars ==
- Tillandsia 'Blue Rinse'
- Tillandsia 'Cooran'
- Tillandsia 'Do-Ra-Me'
