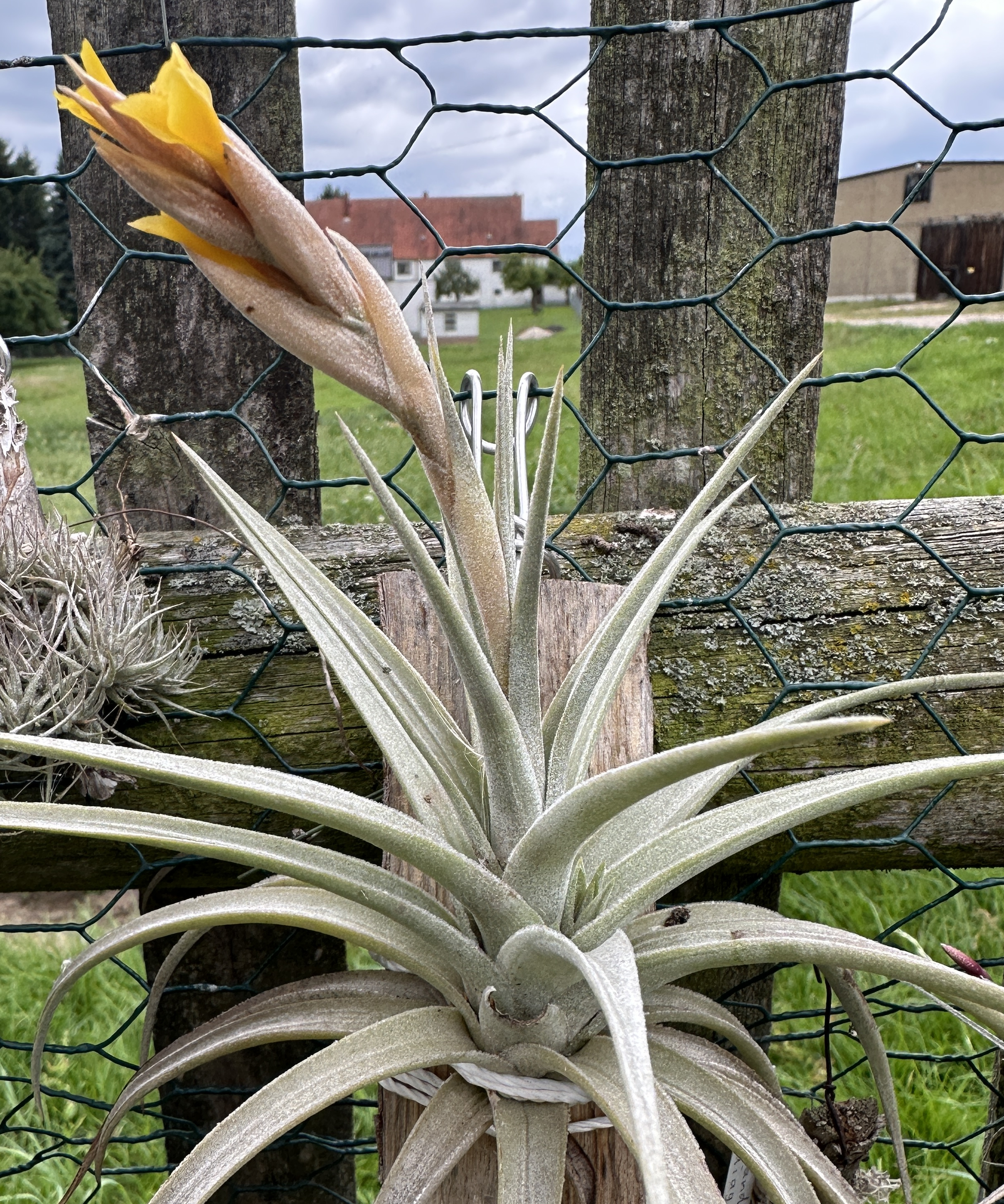

Scientific classification
- Kingdom: Plantae
- Clade: Tracheophytes
- Clade: Angiosperms
- Clade: Monocots
- Clade: Commelinids
- Order: Poales
- Family: Bromeliaceae
- Genus: Tillandsia
- Subgenus: Tillandsia subg. Anoplophytum
- Species: T. ixioides

Binomial name
- Tillandsia ixioides Griseb.

Synonyms
- Anoplophytum luteum E.Morren ex Baker; Tillandsia lutea Baker; Tillandsia ixioides var. occidentalis A.Cast.

= Tillandsia ixioides =

Species of plant

Tillandsia ixioides is a species of flowering plant in the family Bromeliaceae. It is native to South America. Two subspecies are recognized:

1. Tillandsia ixioides subsp. ixioides – Bolivia, Uruguay, Paraguay, northern Argentina
2. Tillandsia ixioides subsp. viridiflora (Rauh) Gouda – Bolivia

== Cultivars ==
- Tillandsia 'Auravale'
- Tillandsia 'Do-Ra-Me'
- Tillandsia 'Kybong'
- Tillandsia 'Mystic Flame'
- Tillandsia 'Mystic Flame Orange'
- Tillandsia 'Peach Parfait'
- Tillandsia 'Poor Ixy'
- Tillandsia 'Tandur'
- Tillandsia 'White Star'
