= Tillandsia toropiensis =

Scientific classification
- Kingdom: Plantae
- Clade: Tracheophytes
- Clade: Angiosperms
- Clade: Monocots
- Clade: Commelinids
- Order: Poales
- Family: Bromeliaceae
- Subfamily: Tillandsioideae
- Genus: Tillandsia
- Subgenus: Tillandsia subg. Anoplophytum
- Species: T. toropiensis

Binomial name
- Tillandsia toropiensis Rauh

Species of plant

Tillandsia toropiensis is a species in the genus Tillandsia. This species is native to Brazil.
