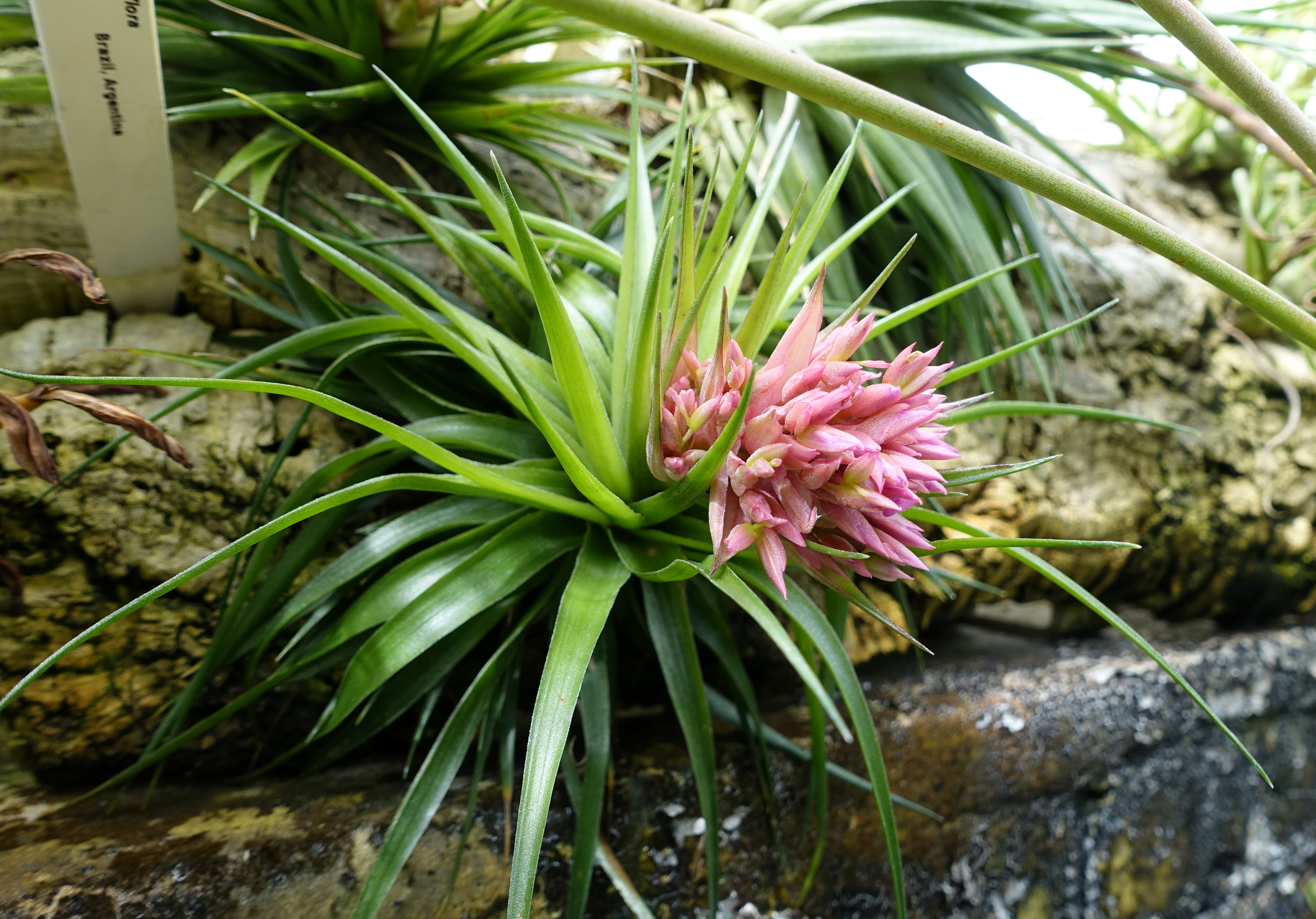

Scientific classification
- Kingdom: Plantae
- Clade: Tracheophytes
- Clade: Angiosperms
- Clade: Monocots
- Clade: Commelinids
- Order: Poales
- Family: Bromeliaceae
- Genus: Tillandsia
- Subgenus: Tillandsia subg. Anoplophytum
- Species: T. geminiflora

Binomial name
- Tillandsia geminiflora Brongn.

Synonyms
- Anoplophytum geminiflorum (Brongn.) E.Morren ex C.Morren; Tillandsia rubida Lindl.; Anoplophytum rubidum (Lindl.) Beer; Anoplophytum paniculatum E.Morren ex Baker; Tillandsia caldasiana Baker; Tillandsia incana Wawra

= Tillandsia geminiflora =

Species of plant

Tillandsia geminiflora is a species in the genus Tillandsia. This species is native to Brazil, Suriname, Paraguay, Uruguay, and the Misiones Province of Argentina.

Two varieties are recognized:

1. Tillandsia geminiflora var. geminiflora – most of species range
2. Tillandsia geminiflora var. incana (Wawra) Mez – Uruguay and southeastern Brazil

== Cultivars ==
- Tillandsia 'Bushfire'
- Tillandsia 'J. R.'
- Tillandsia 'Mystic Twins'
- Tillandsia 'Pink Sugar'
- Tillandsia 'Pink Surprise'
