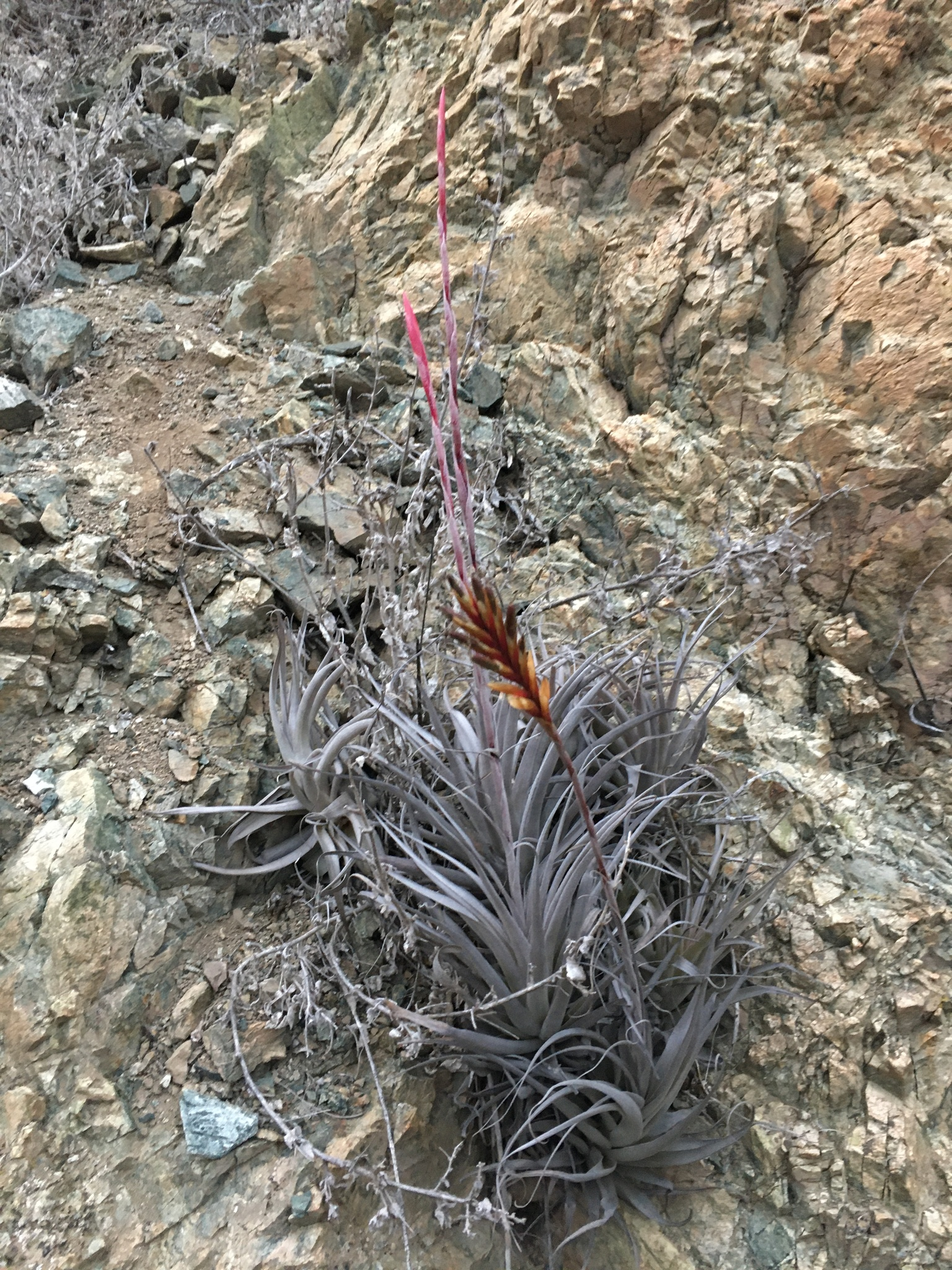

Scientific classification
- Kingdom: Plantae
- Clade: Tracheophytes
- Clade: Angiosperms
- Clade: Monocots
- Clade: Commelinids
- Order: Poales
- Family: Bromeliaceae
- Genus: Tillandsia
- Subgenus: Tillandsia subg. Anoplophytum
- Species: T. geissei

Binomial name
- Tillandsia geissei Philippi

= Tillandsia geissei =

Species of plant

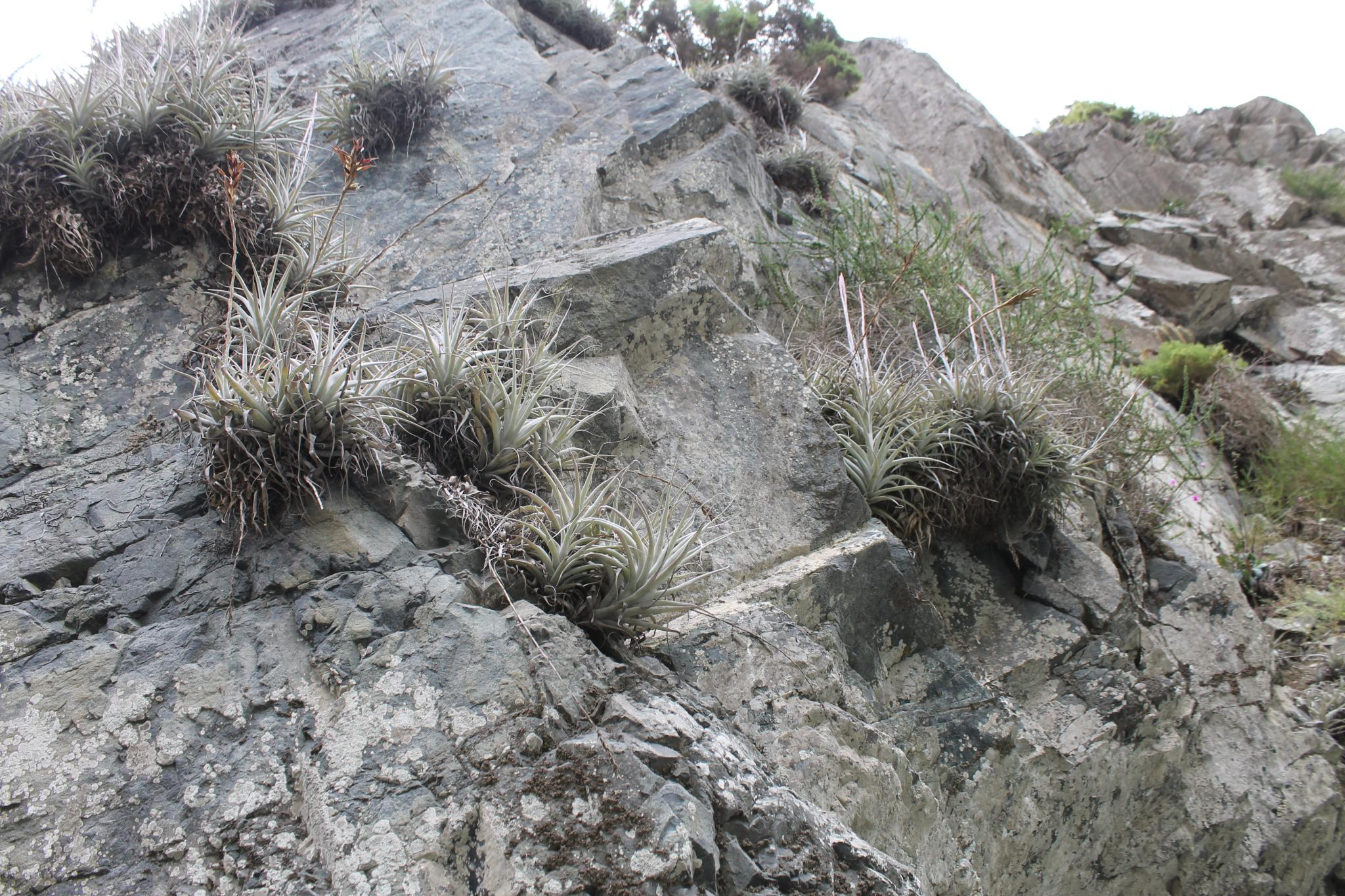
Tillandsia geissei in Paposo, Chile

Tillandsia geissei is a plant species in the genus Tillandsia. This species is endemic to Chile.
