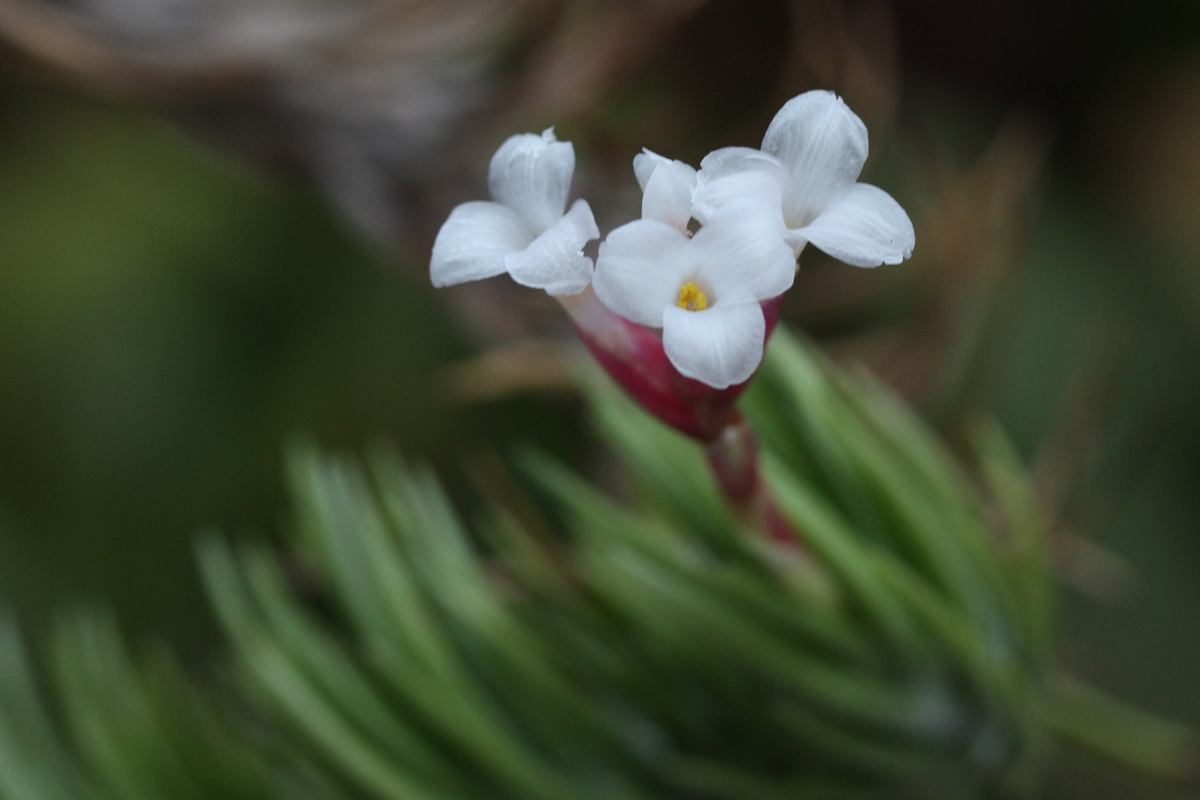

Scientific classification
- Kingdom: Plantae
- Clade: Embryophytes
- Clade: Tracheophytes
- Clade: Spermatophytes
- Clade: Angiosperms
- Clade: Monocots
- Clade: Commelinids
- Order: Poales
- Family: Bromeliaceae
- Genus: Tillandsia
- Subgenus: Tillandsia subg. Anoplophytum
- Species: T. araujei

Binomial name
- Tillandsia araujei Mez

Synonyms
- Heterotypic Synonyms: Tillandsia araujei var. minima E.Pereira & I.A.Penna

= Tillandsia araujei =

Species of flowering plant

Tillandsia araujei is a species of flowering plant in the family Bromeliaceae. This species is endemic to Brazil.
