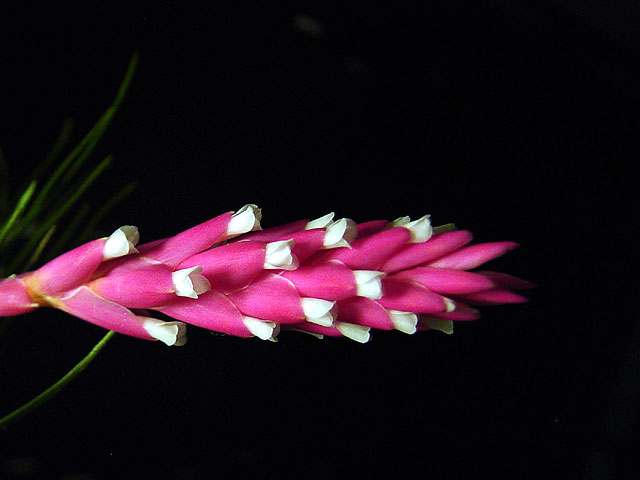

Scientific classification
- Kingdom: Plantae
- Clade: Tracheophytes
- Clade: Angiosperms
- Clade: Monocots
- Clade: Commelinids
- Order: Poales
- Family: Bromeliaceae
- Genus: Tillandsia
- Subgenus: Tillandsia subg. Anoplophytum
- Species: T. tenuifolia

Binomial name
- Tillandsia tenuifolia L.

Synonyms
- Tillandsia triflora Vell.; Tillandsia pityphylla Mart. ex Schult. & Schult.f.; Diaphoranthema triflora (Vell.) Beer; Anoplophytum amoenum E.Morren; Anoplophytum brachypodium E.Morren ex Baker; Tillandsia brachypodia Mez; Tillandsia cyanescens Mez; Tillandsia pulchella Hook.; Tillandsia pulchra Hook.; Tillandsia subulata Vell.; Anoplophytum pulchellum (Hook.) Beer; Diaphoranthema subulata (Vell.) Beer; Tillandsia autumnalis F.Muell.; Tillandsia astragaloides Mez; Tillandsia firmula Mez; Tillandsia pseudostricta Chodat & Vischer; Tillandsia appariciana E.Pereira; Tillandsia pernambucensis E.Pereira

= Tillandsia tenuifolia =

Species of plant

Tillandsia tenuifolia, the narrowleaf airplant, is a species in the genus Tillandsia. This species is widespread across much of South America and the Caribbean islands.

Four varieties are recognized:

1. Tillandsia tenuifolia var. disticha (L.B.Sm.) L.B.Sm. – States of Rio de Janeiro + São Paulo
2. Tillandsia tenuifolia var. saxicola (L.B.Sm.) L.B.Sm. – States of Rio de Janeiro + São Paulo
3. Tillandsia tenuifolia var. tenuifolia – most of species range
4. Tillandsia tenuifolia var. vaginata (Wawra) L.B.Sm. – Jamaica, Martinique, Brazil, Paraguay

== Cultivars ==
- Tillandsia 'Bingo'
- Tillandsia 'Bonsall Beauty'
- Tillandsia 'Coconut Ice'
- Tillandsia 'Emerald Forest'
- Tillandsia 'Flamingoes'
- Tillandsia 'Gildora'
- Tillandsia 'Green Goddess'
- Tillandsia 'Hoja Gorda'
- Tillandsia 'Perky Pink'
- Tillandsia 'Sexton'
- Tillandsia 'Silver Comb'
