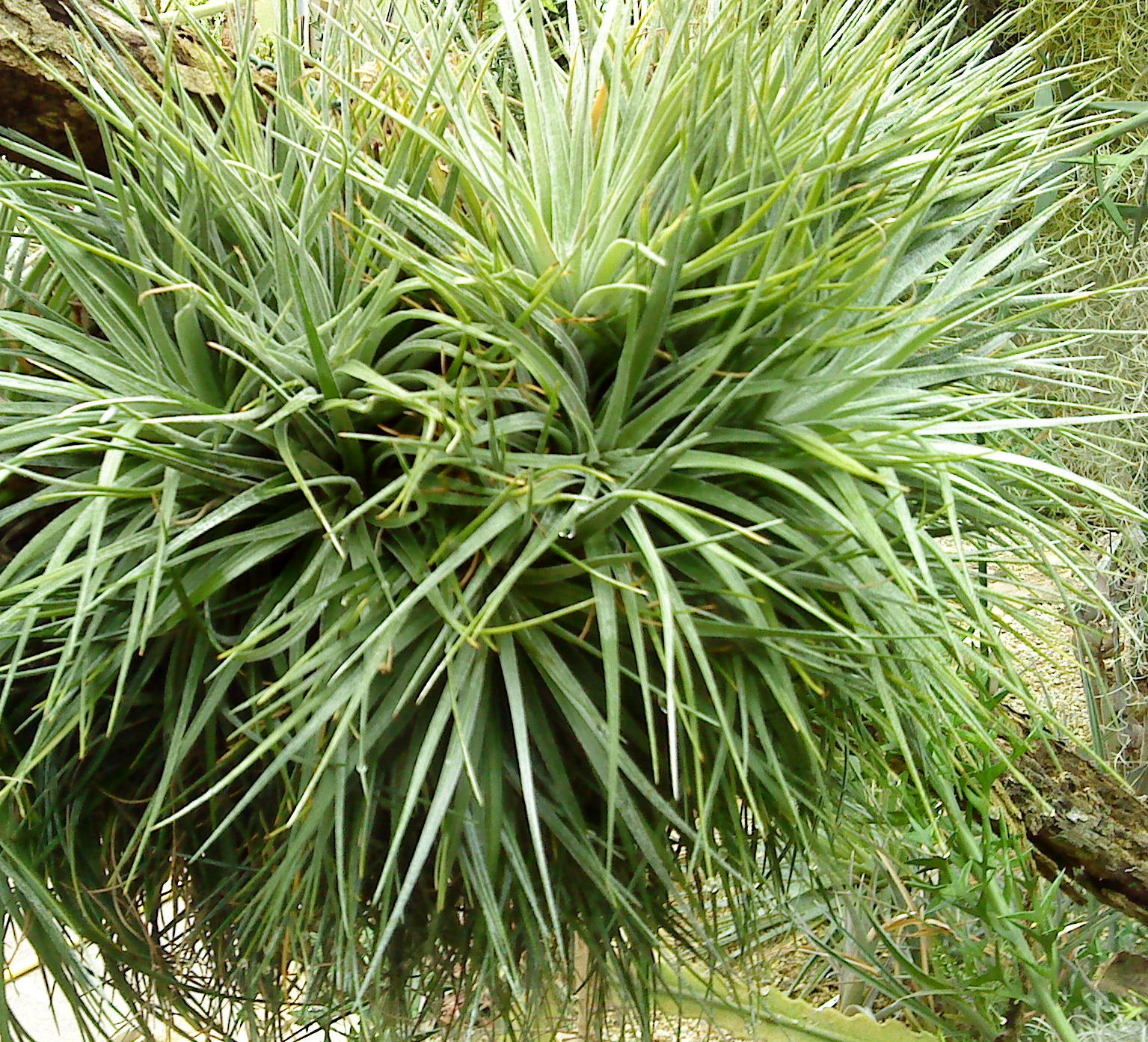
- Tillandsia stricta foliage

Scientific classification
- Kingdom: Plantae
- Clade: Tracheophytes
- Clade: Angiosperms
- Clade: Monocots
- Clade: Commelinids
- Order: Poales
- Family: Bromeliaceae
- Genus: Tillandsia
- Subgenus: Tillandsia subg. Anoplophytum (Beer) Baker

Species
- See text

= Tillandsia subg. Anoplophytum =

Subgenus of flowering plants

Tillandsia subg. Anoplophytum is a subgenus of the genus Tillandsia.

== Species ==
Species accepted by Encyclopedia of Bromeliads as of October 2022:

- Tillandsia aeranthos (Loisel.) L.B.Sm.
- Tillandsia albertiana Verv.
- Tillandsia araujei Mez
- Tillandsia bella T.Strehl
- Tillandsia bergeri Mez
- Tillandsia bismarckii Rauh & Lehmann
- Tillandsia brachyphylla Baker
- Tillandsia burle-marxii Ehlers
- Tillandsia carminea W.Till
- Tillandsia castelensis Leme & W.Till
- Tillandsia catimbauensis Leme, W.Till & J.A.Siqueira
- Tillandsia chapeuensis Rauh
- Tillandsia chasmophyta H.Büneker, R.Pontes & K.Soares
- Tillandsia eltoniana E.Pereira
- Tillandsia ertonii E.H.Souza & Leme
- Tillandsia esseriana Rauh & L.B.Sm.
- Tillandsia gardneri Lindl.
- Tillandsia geissei R.A.Philippi
- Tillandsia geminiflora Brongn.
- Tillandsia globosa Wawra
- Tillandsia grazielae Sucre & Braga
- Tillandsia guelzii Rauh emend. Gouda
- Tillandsia gutteana Weber
- Tillandsia hemkeri Rauh
- Tillandsia heubergeri Ehlers
- Tillandsia hofackeri Ehlers
- Tillandsia horstii Rauh emend Heidt
- Tillandsia iassuensis L. Hrom. & H. Hrom.
- Tillandsia itaubensis T.Strehl
- Tillandsia ixioides Griseb.
- Tillandsia jonesii T.Strehl
- Tillandsia jucunda A.Cast.
- Tillandsia kautskyi E.Pereira
- Tillandsia leonamiana E.Pereira
- Tillandsia leucopetala H.Büneker
- Tillandsia longiscapa Leme & W. Till
- Tillandsia macbrideana L.B.Sm.
- Tillandsia mantiqueirae Paixão-Souza, N.G. Silva & R.J.V. Alves
- Tillandsia milagrensis Leme
- Tillandsia minasgeraisensis Ehlers & W.Till
- Tillandsia montana Reitz
- Tillandsia nana Baker
- Tillandsia nathanii E.H.Souza & Leme
- Tillandsia neglecta E.Pereira
- Tillandsia nuptialis R.Braga & Sucre
- Tillandsia oliveirae E.H.Souza & Leme
- Tillandsia organensis Ehlers
- Tillandsia pampasensis Rauh
- Tillandsia paraibensis R.A.Pontes
- Tillandsia pardoi Gouda
- Tillandsia piauiensis Ehlers & J.Claus
- Tillandsia pohliana Mez
- Tillandsia polzii Ehlers
- Tillandsia pseudomacbrideana Rauh
- Tillandsia pseudomontana W.Weber & Ehlers
- Tillandsia reclinata Pereira & Martinelli
- Tillandsia recurvifolia Hook.
- Tillandsia renateehlersiae Leme & Gouda
- Tillandsia roseiflora Ehlers & W.Weber
- Tillandsia seideliana E.Pereira
- Tillandsia sprengeliana Klotzsch ex Mez
- Tillandsia stricta Sol.
- Tillandsia sucrei E.Pereira
- Tillandsia tenuifolia L.
- Tillandsia thiekenii Ehlers
- Tillandsia toropiensis Rauh
- Tillandsia winkleri T.Strehl
- Tillandsia witeckii H.Büneker, R.Pontes & K.Soares
