= Tillandsia nana =

Scientific classification
- Kingdom: Plantae
- Clade: Tracheophytes
- Clade: Angiosperms
- Clade: Monocots
- Clade: Commelinids
- Order: Poales
- Family: Bromeliaceae
- Genus: Tillandsia
- Subgenus: Tillandsia subg. Anoplophytum
- Species: T. nana

Binomial name
- Tillandsia nana Baker

Synonyms
- Tillandsia calocephala Wittm.

Species of plant

Tillandsia nana is a species of flowering plant in the Bromeliaceae family. This species is native to Bolivia.
