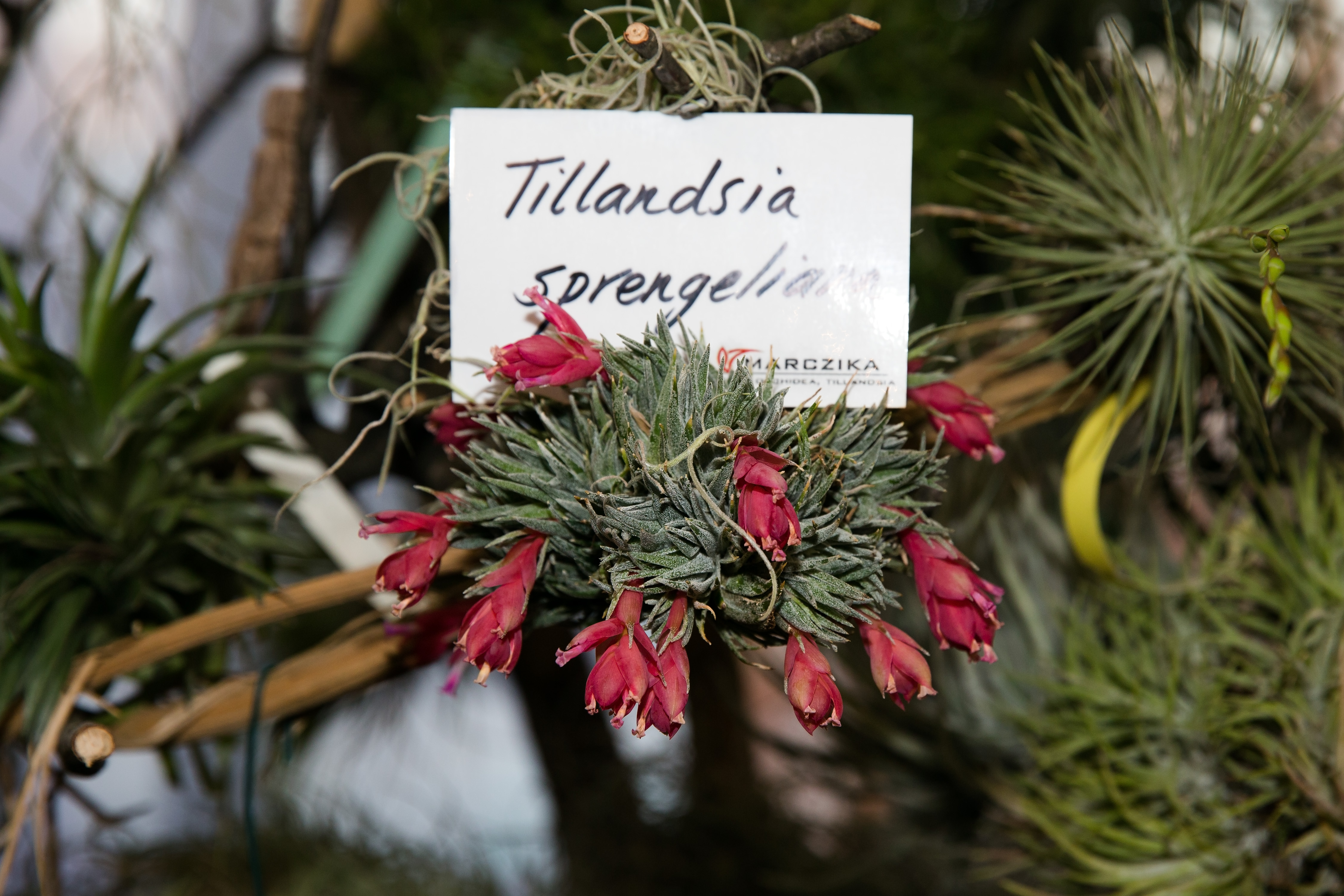

Scientific classification
- Kingdom: Plantae
- Clade: Embryophytes
- Clade: Tracheophytes
- Clade: Spermatophytes
- Clade: Angiosperms
- Clade: Monocots
- Clade: Commelinids
- Order: Poales
- Family: Bromeliaceae
- Genus: Tillandsia
- Subgenus: Tillandsia subg. Anoplophytum
- Species: T. sprengeliana

Binomial name
- Tillandsia sprengeliana Klotzsch ex Mez

Synonyms
- Homotypic Synonyms: Tillandsia purpurea Spreng.; Heterotypic Synonyms: Anoplophytum sprengelianum Beer

= Tillandsia sprengeliana =

Species of plant

Tillandsia sprengeliana is a species of flowering plant in the family Bromeliaceae. This species is endemic to Brazil.
