= Grazielodendron =

Scientific classification
- Kingdom: Plantae
- Clade: Tracheophytes
- Clade: Angiosperms
- Clade: Eudicots
- Clade: Rosids
- Order: Fabales
- Family: Fabaceae
- Subfamily: Faboideae
- Tribe: Dalbergieae
- Genus: Grazielodendron; H.C.Lima
- Species: G. riodocensis

Binomial name
- Grazielodendron riodocensis H.C.Lima

Synonyms
- Grazielodendron rio-docensis H.C.Lima

Genus of legumes

Grazielodendron riodocensis is a species of flowering plant in the legume family, Fabaceae. It belongs to the subfamily Faboideae, and was recently assigned to the informal monophyletic Pterocarpus clade within the Dalbergieae. It is the only member of the genus Grazielodendron. It is only found in eastern Brazil.

The genus name of Grazielodendron is in honour of Graziela Maciel Barroso (1912–2003), a Brazilian botanist, and also "'dendron" (δένδρον) which is the Greek word for "tree". The Latin specific epithet of riodocensis refers Rio Doce or Doce River in Brazil. Grazielodendron riodocensis was first described and published in Bradea Vol.3 on page 401 in 1983.
