= Blanchetia coronata =

Scientific classification
- Kingdom: Plantae
- Clade: Tracheophytes
- Clade: Angiosperms
- Clade: Eudicots
- Clade: Asterids
- Order: Asterales
- Family: Asteraceae
- Genus: Blanchetia
- Species: B. coronata

Binomial name
- Blanchetia coronata (G.M.Barroso) Loeuille & Pirani

Synonyms
- Irwinia coronata G.M.Barroso

Species of flowering plant

Blanchetia coronata is a species of flowering plant in the family Asteraceae, endemic to the state of Bahia, Brazil. It was first described by Graziela Barroso in 1980 as Irwinia coronata. As I. coronata it was the only species in the former monotypic genus Irwinia.
