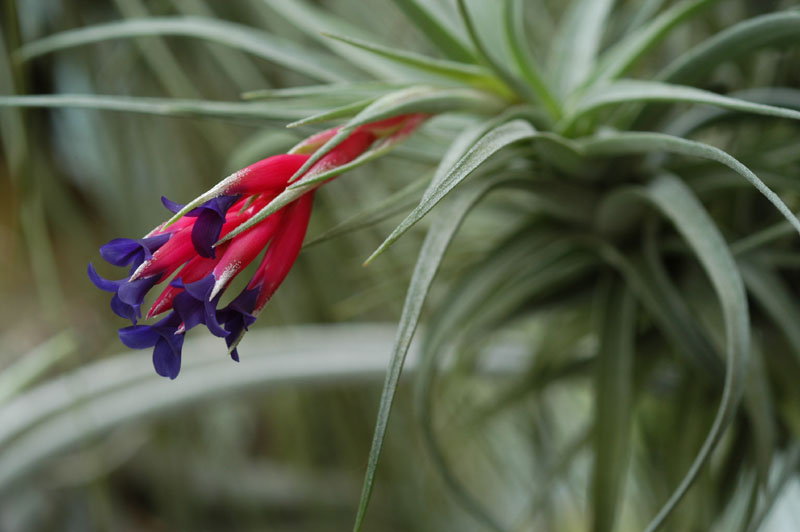

Scientific classification
- Kingdom: Plantae
- Clade: Tracheophytes
- Clade: Angiosperms
- Clade: Monocots
- Clade: Commelinids
- Order: Poales
- Family: Bromeliaceae
- Genus: Tillandsia
- Subgenus: Tillandsia subg. Anoplophytum
- Species: T. aeranthos

Binomial name
- Tillandsia aeranthos (Loiseleur) L.B. Smith

Synonyms
- Pourretia aeranthos Loisel.; Anoplophytum aeranthos (Loisel.) Beer; Tillandsia dianthoidea G.Rossi; Tillandsia bicolor Brongn.; Anoplophytum dianthoideum (G.Rossi) Beer; Anoplophytum roseum Beer; Tillandsia unca Griseb.; Tillandsia microxiphion Baker

= Tillandsia aeranthos =

Species of flowering plant

Tillandsia aeranthos is a species of plant in the genus Tillandsia. This species is native to southern Brazil, Paraguay, Uruguay, and Argentina.

== Cultivars ==
- Tillandsia 'Bergos'
- Tillandsia 'Bob Whitman'
- Tillandsia 'Cooroy'
- Tillandsia 'Ed Doherty'
- Tillandsia 'Eureka'
- Tillandsia 'Flamingoes'
- Tillandsia 'Kayjay'
- Tillandsia 'Mariposa'
- Tillandsia 'Nez Misso'
- Tillandsia 'Noosa'
- Tillandsia 'Oboe'
- Tillandsia 'Oliver Twist'
- Tillandsia 'Purple Giant'
- Tillandsia 'Tropic Skye'
- Tillandsia 'Veronica's Mariposa'
- Tillandsia 'Winner's Circle'
