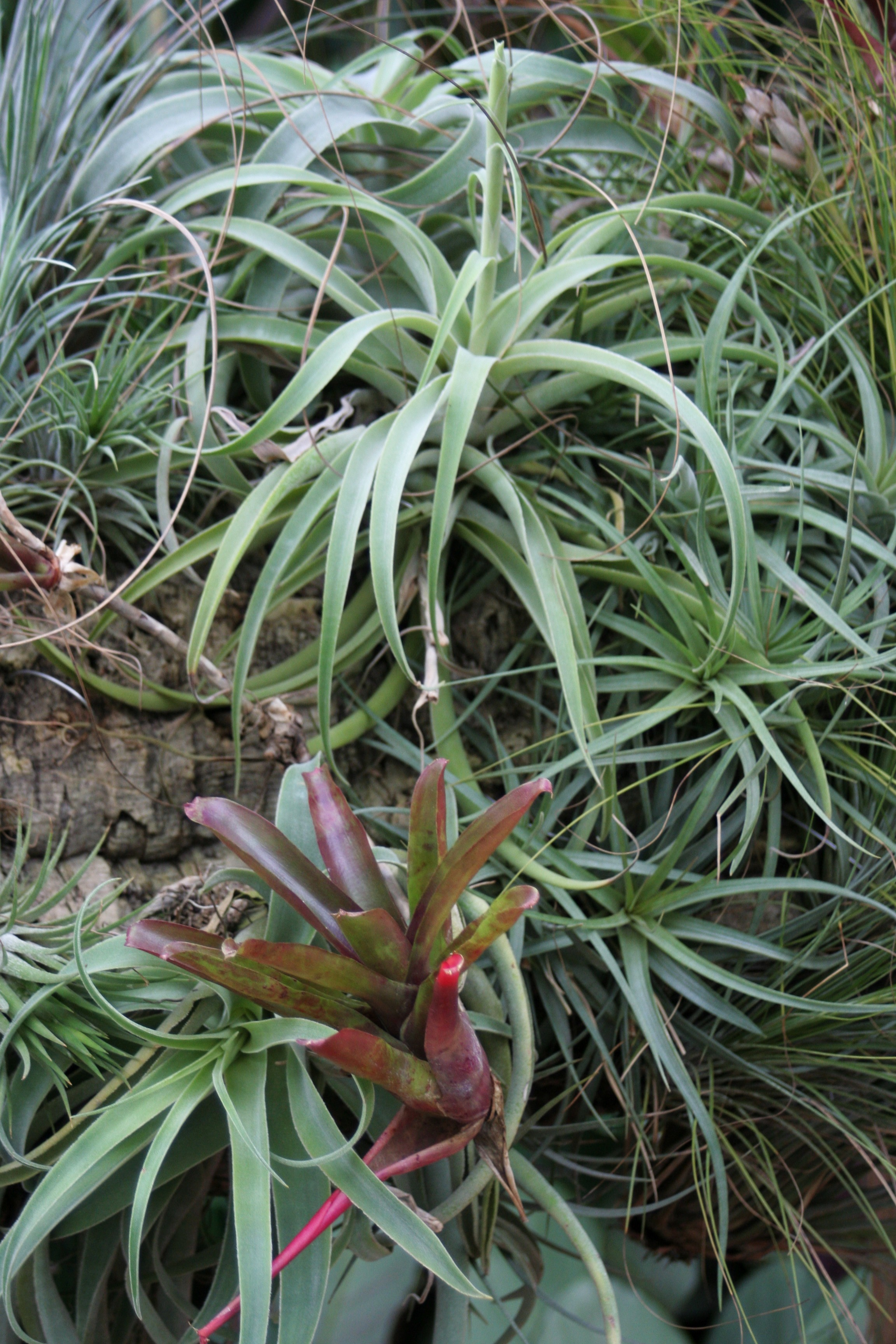

Scientific classification
- Kingdom: Plantae
- Clade: Tracheophytes
- Clade: Angiosperms
- Clade: Monocots
- Clade: Commelinids
- Order: Poales
- Family: Bromeliaceae
- Genus: Tillandsia
- Subgenus: Tillandsia subg. Anoplophytum
- Species: T. albertiana

Binomial name
- Tillandsia albertiana F. Vervoorst

= Tillandsia albertiana =

Species of flowering plant

Tillandsia albertiana is a species of plant in the genus Tillandsia. It is endemic to the Salta Province of northern Argentina.

== Cultivars ==
- Tillandsia 'Lisa's Jewell'
- Tillandsia 'Mystic Albert'
- Tillandsia 'Mystic Burgundy'
- Tillandsia 'Mystic Circle'
- Tillandsia 'Mystic Flame'
- Tillandsia 'Mystic Flame Orange'
- Tillandsia 'Mystic Rainbow'
- Tillandsia 'Mystic Rainbow Peach'
- Tillandsia 'Mystic Rainbow Pink'
- Tillandsia 'Mystic Trumpet'
- Tillandsia 'Mystic Trumpet Peach'
- Tillandsia 'Mystic Trumpet Pink'
- Tillandsia 'Mystic Twins'
