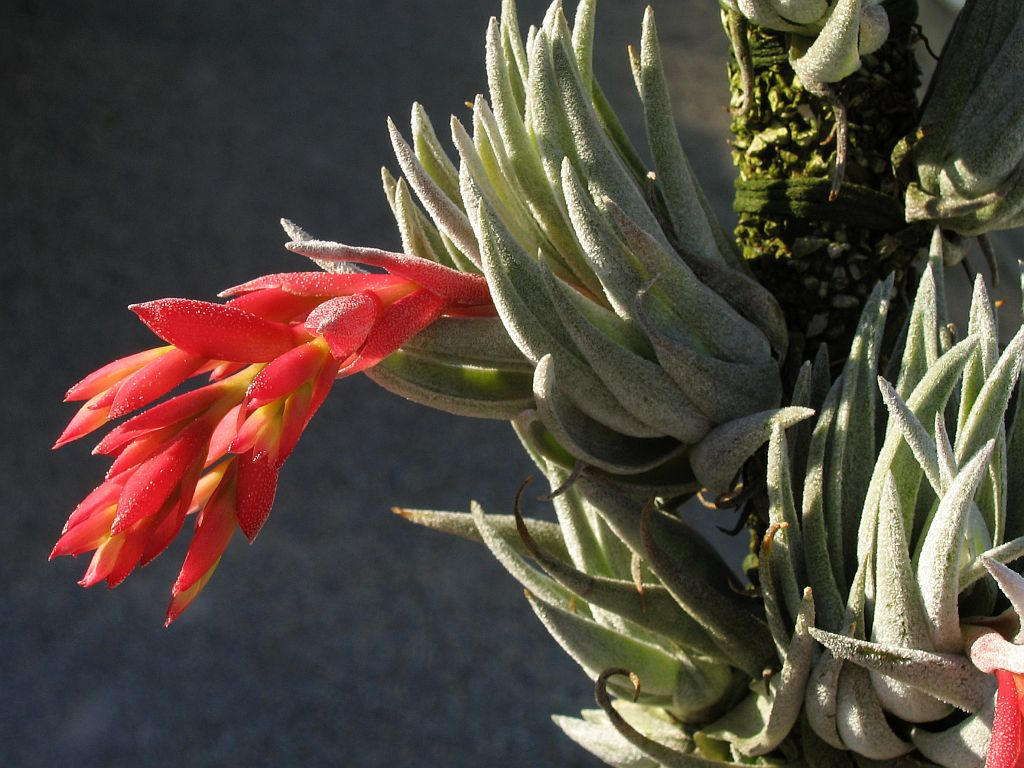
- Tillandsia brachyphylla

Scientific classification
- Kingdom: Plantae
- Clade: Tracheophytes
- Clade: Angiosperms
- Clade: Monocots
- Clade: Commelinids
- Order: Poales
- Family: Bromeliaceae
- Subfamily: Tillandsioideae
- Genus: Tillandsia
- Subgenus: Tillandsia subg. Anoplophytum
- Species: T. brachyphylla

Binomial name
- Tillandsia brachyphylla Baker

Synonyms
- Anoplophytum binotii É.Morren ex Baker

= Tillandsia brachyphylla =

Species of plant

Tillandsia brachyphylla is a species of flowering plant in the Bromeliaceae family. This species is endemic to Brazil.
