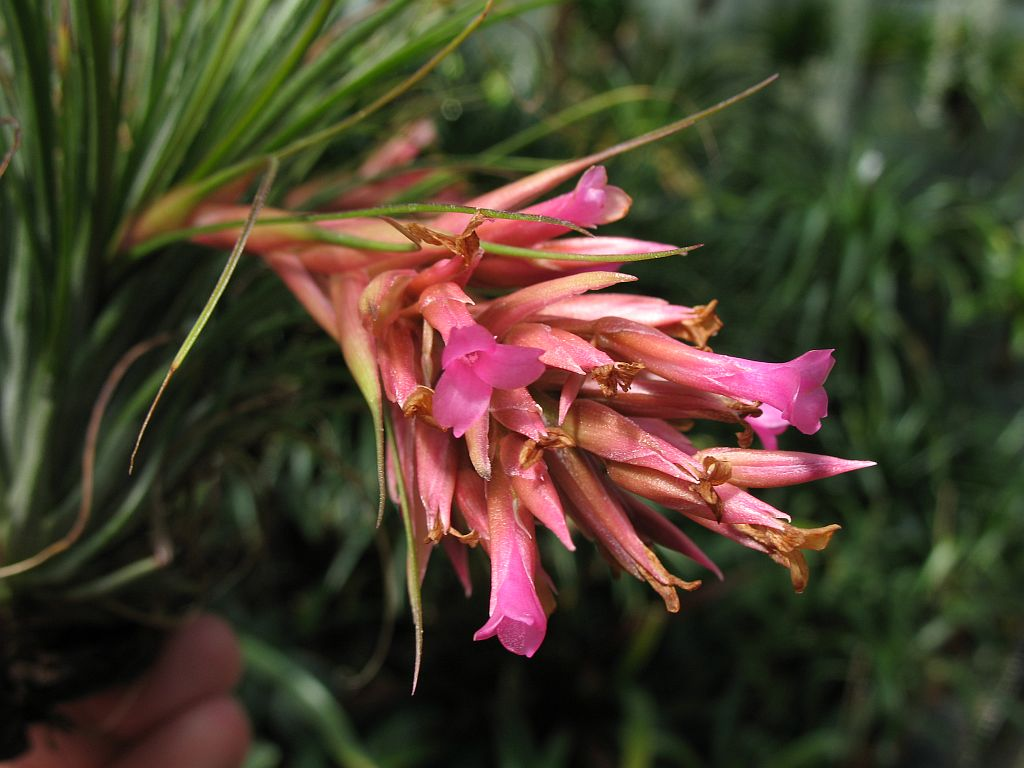

Scientific classification
- Kingdom: Plantae
- Clade: Tracheophytes
- Clade: Angiosperms
- Clade: Monocots
- Clade: Commelinids
- Order: Poales
- Family: Bromeliaceae
- Genus: Tillandsia
- Subgenus: Tillandsia subg. Anoplophytum
- Species: T. globosa

Binomial name
- Tillandsia globosa Wawra

= Tillandsia globosa =

Species of plant

Tillandsia globosa is a species in the genus Tillandsia. This species is native to Brazil and Venezuela.

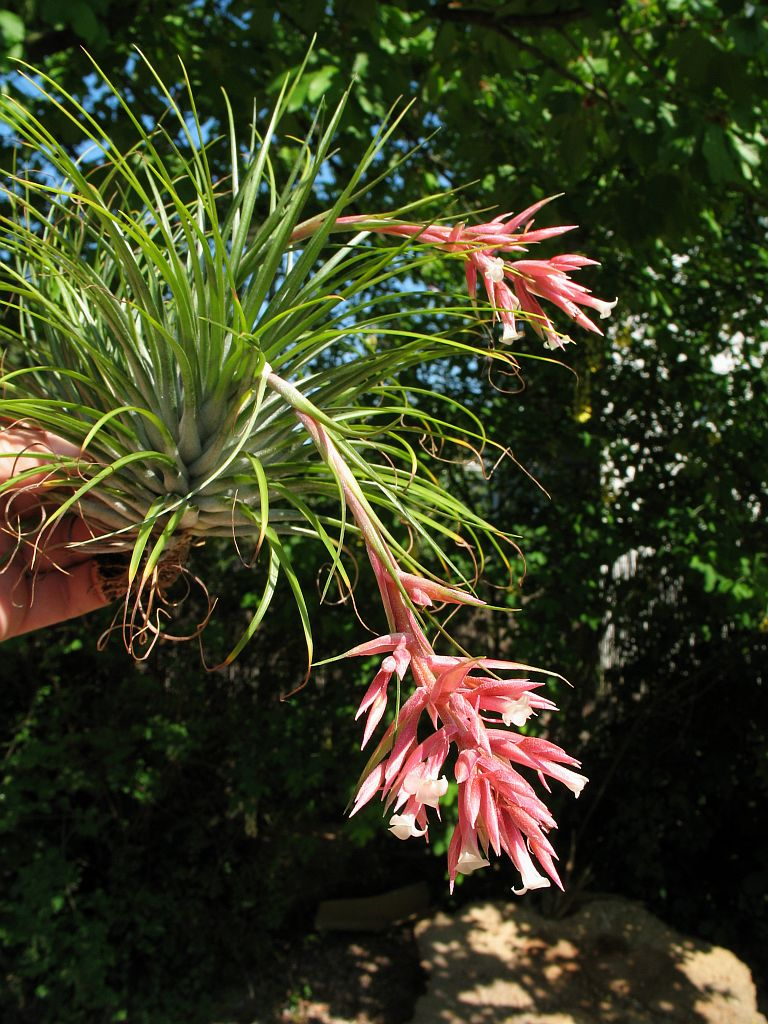
