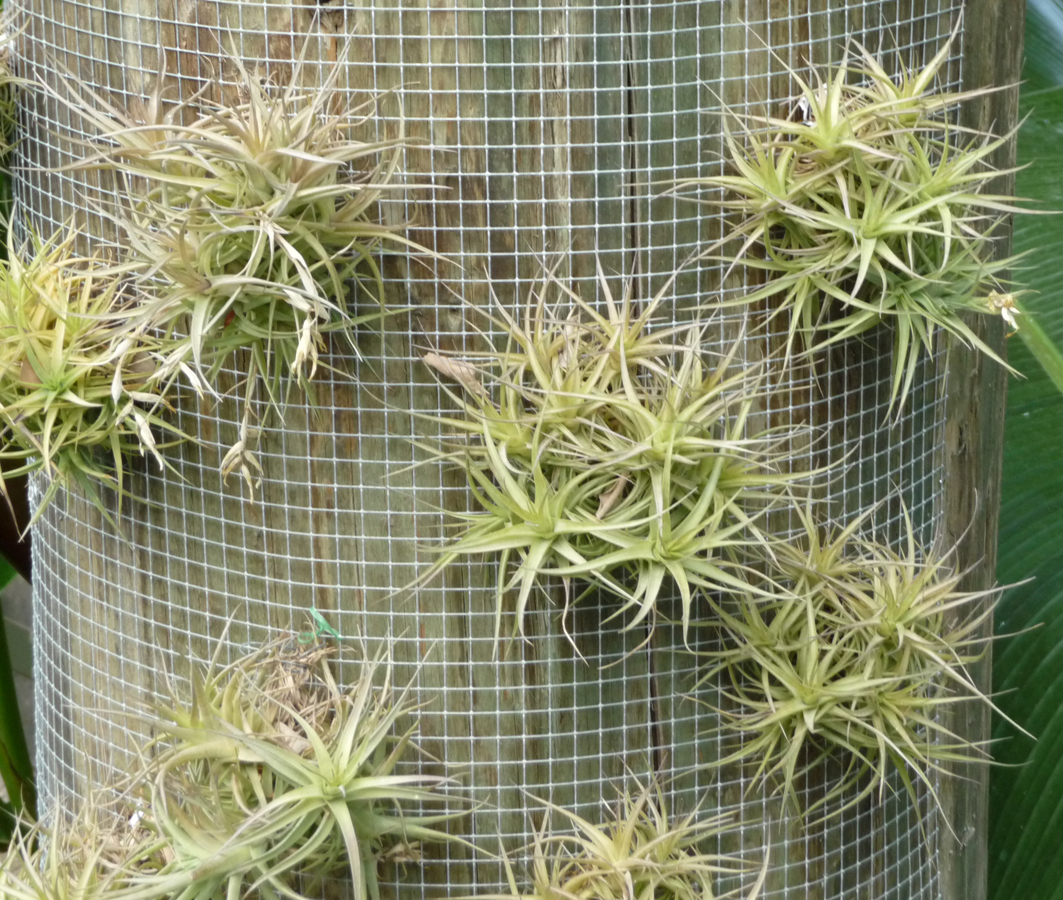

Scientific classification
- Kingdom: Plantae
- Clade: Embryophytes
- Clade: Tracheophytes
- Clade: Spermatophytes
- Clade: Angiosperms
- Clade: Monocots
- Clade: Commelinids
- Order: Poales
- Family: Bromeliaceae
- Genus: Tillandsia
- Subgenus: Tillandsia subg. Anoplophytum
- Species: T. bergeri

Binomial name
- Tillandsia bergeri Mez

Synonyms
- Heterotypic Synonyms: Tillandsia dianthoidea var. grisea Guillaumin

= Tillandsia bergeri =

Species of flowering plant

Tillandsia bergeri is a species of flowering plant in the family Bromeliaceae. This species is native to Brazil.

== Taxonomy ==
=== Cultivars ===
Recognized cultivars include:

- Tillandsia 'Bergos'
- Tillandsia 'Bob Whitman'
