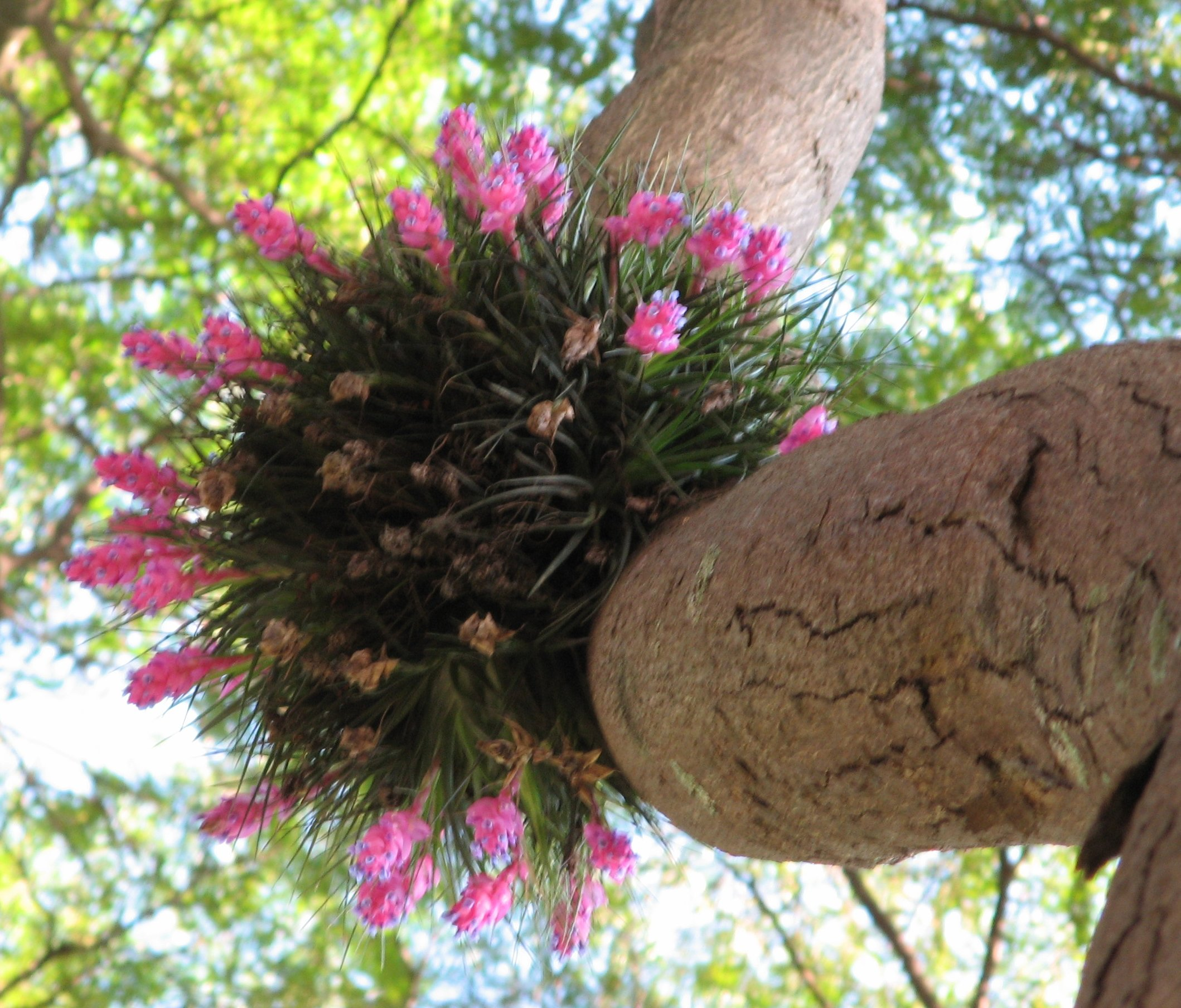

Scientific classification
- Kingdom: Plantae
- Clade: Tracheophytes
- Clade: Angiosperms
- Clade: Monocots
- Clade: Commelinids
- Order: Poales
- Family: Bromeliaceae
- Genus: Tillandsia
- Subgenus: Tillandsia subg. Anoplophytum
- Species: T. recurvifolia

Binomial name
- Tillandsia recurvifolia Hooker

Synonyms
- Tillandsia meridionalis Baker; Anoplophytum refulgens E.Morren ex Baker; Tillandsia stricta var. paraguariensis Hassl.

= Tillandsia recurvifolia =

Species of epiphyte

Tillandsia recurvifolia is a species in the genus Tillandsia. This species is native to Bolivia, Paraguay, Uruguay, Argentina, and Brazil.

== Cultivars ==
- Tillandsia 'Cotton Candy'
- Tillandsia 'Flaming Cascade'
- Tillandsia 'Flaming Spire'
- Tillandsia 'Gildora'
- Tillandsia 'Houston'
- Tillandsia 'Mystic Circle'
- Tillandsia 'Ned Kelly'
- Tillandsia 'Oboe'
- Tillandsia 'Really Red'
- Tillandsia 'Southern Cross'
- Tillandsia 'White Star'
