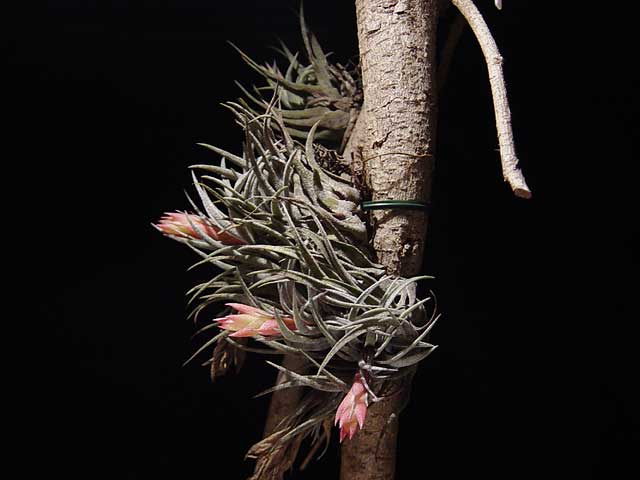

Scientific classification
- Kingdom: Plantae
- Clade: Embryophytes
- Clade: Tracheophytes
- Clade: Spermatophytes
- Clade: Angiosperms
- Clade: Monocots
- Clade: Commelinids
- Order: Poales
- Family: Bromeliaceae
- Genus: Tillandsia
- Subgenus: Tillandsia subg. Anoplophytum
- Species: T. kautskyi

Binomial name
- Tillandsia kautskyi E.Pereira

= Tillandsia kautskyi =

Species of plant

Tillandsia kautskyi is a species in the genus Tillandsia, endemic to Brazil.
