= Blanchetia =

Scientific classification
- Kingdom: Plantae
- Clade: Embryophytes
- Clade: Tracheophytes
- Clade: Angiosperms
- Clade: Eudicots
- Clade: Asterids
- Order: Asterales
- Family: Asteraceae
- Subfamily: Vernonioideae
- Tribe: Vernonieae
- Genus: Blanchetia; DC.

Synonyms
- Irwinia G.M.Barroso

Genus of flowering plants

Blanchetia is a genus of flowering plants in the family Asteraceae, It is endemic to Brazil (states of Bahia, Alagoas, Paraíba, Pernambuco, and Sergipe).

== Species ==
As of May 2024, Plants of the World Online accepted two species:

- Blanchetia coronata (G.M.Barroso) Loeuille & Pirani
- Blanchetia heterotricha DC.
