= Tillandsia catimbauensis =

Scientific classification
- Kingdom: Plantae
- Clade: Tracheophytes
- Clade: Angiosperms
- Clade: Monocots
- Clade: Commelinids
- Order: Poales
- Family: Bromeliaceae
- Subfamily: Tillandsioideae
- Genus: Tillandsia
- Subgenus: Tillandsia subg. Anoplophytum
- Species: T. catimbauensis

Binomial name
- Tillandsia catimbauensis Leme, W.Till & J.A.Siqueira

Species of plant

Tillandsia catimbauensis is a species in the genus Tillandsia. This species is endemic to Brazil.
