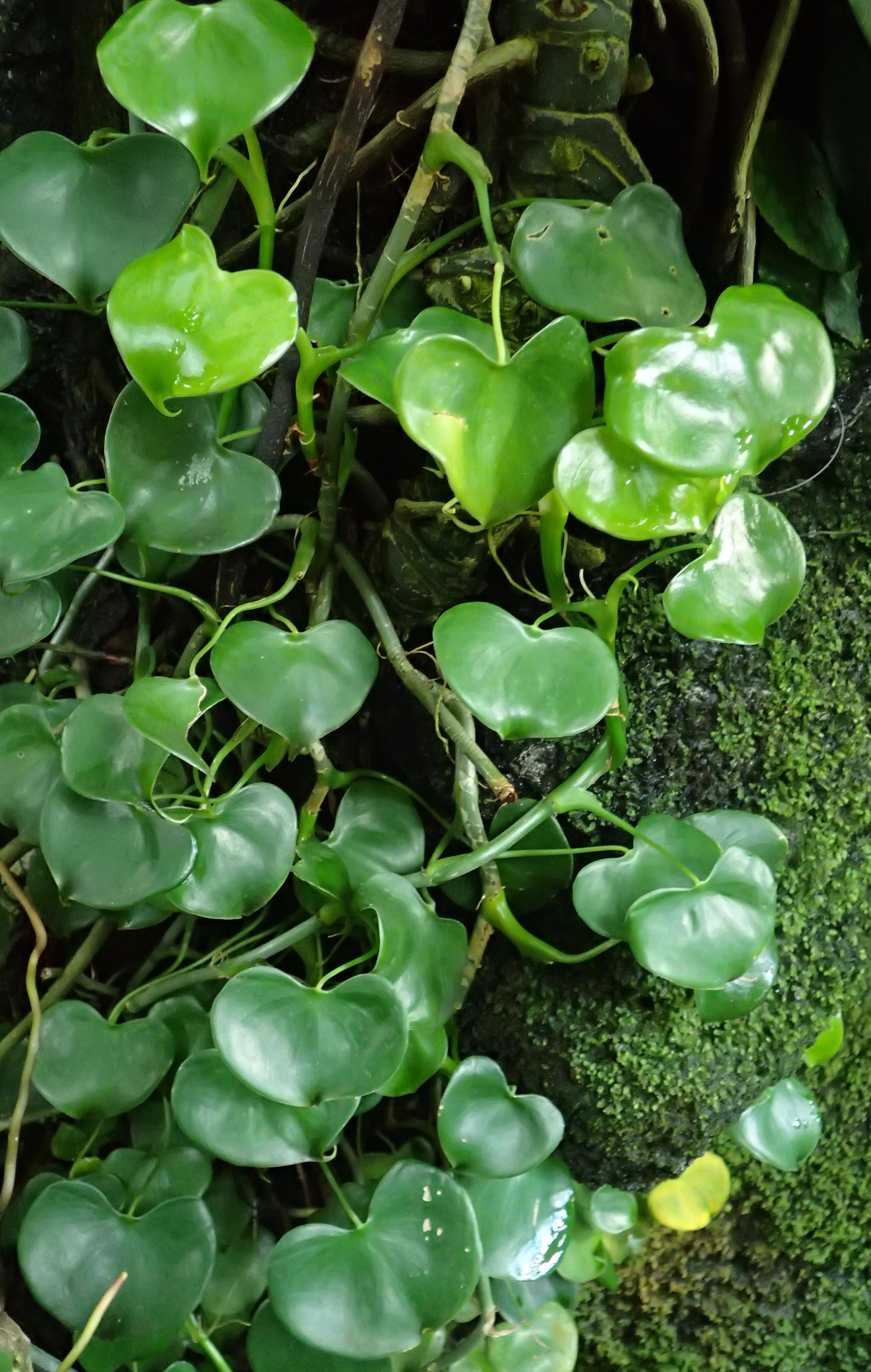

Scientific classification
- Kingdom: Plantae
- Clade: Tracheophytes
- Clade: Angiosperms
- Clade: Monocots
- Order: Alismatales
- Family: Araceae
- Genus: Philodendron
- Species: P. grazielae

Binomial name
- Philodendron grazielae G.S.Bunting

= Philodendron grazielae =

Species of plant

Philodendron grazielae is a species of plant in the genus Philodendron native to Peru and Brazil. It was named after the Brazilian botanist Graziela Barroso, who collected the original specimen that was then cultivated in the Rio de Janeiro Botanical Garden in the 1960s. It is a relatively small species with cordate leaves that grow 4–11 centimetres (1.6–4.3 in) wide, and it grows in a climbing habit.

== See also ==
- List of Philodendron species
