= Graziela Barroso =

Brazilian botanist

- Born: 11 April 1912; Corumbá, Mato Grosso
- Died: 5 May 2003 (aged 91); Rio de Janeiro
- Scientific career
- Fields: Botany
- Institutions: University of Brasília
- Author abbrev. (botany): G.M.Barroso

Graziela Maciel Barroso (1912–2003) was a Brazilian botanist who has been known as a leading expert of the flora of Brazil, as well as a specialist of Compositae. She was chairman and Professor of the Department of Plant Biology at the University of Brasília, and has published three volumes of Sistemática de Angiospermas do Brasil. The standard author abbreviation G.M.Barroso is used to indicate this person as the author when citing a botanical name. Retired from the classroom in 1982, her fourth book, Fruits and Seeds, was published in 1999.

Barroso identified over one hundred species, and two bromeliads have been named in her honor: Tillandsia grazielae and Tillandsia barrosoae, as well as Philodendron grazielae and Philodendron barrosoanum. More than 25 more plant species identified in recent years have been named after her, such as Dorstenia grazielae (caiapiá-da-graziela) from the Moraceae family and Diatenopteryx grazielae (maria-preta). Also, three genera of plants have been named after her: Grazielanthus (from the family Monimiaceae), Grazielia (from Asteraceae family), and Grazielodendron (from Fabaceae family).

== Life and career ==
=== Early years ===
Graziela Maciel Barroso was born 11 April 1912 in Corumbá, Mato Grosso. She was one of eleven siblings. At the age of 16, she married Liberato Joaquim Barroso, who worked as an agronomist at the Jardim Botânico do Rio de Janeiro. When she reached 18 years of age, she had her first child, a daughter named Mirtila. Her second child, Manfredo, was born only one year later when Graziela was 19 years old. Her husband's work caused the family to move around constantly before they finally settled in Rio de Janeiro in the 1940s when he was given the role of director of Horto Florestal.

=== Education ===
After settling in Rio, Graziela obtained a job as a seed selector at the Horto Florestal and joined the Jardim Botânico do Rio de Janeiro as an intern. In 1946, she passed a public exam earning a place as a naturalist at the Jardim Botânico do Rio de Janeiro. She was the first woman to ever be awarded this position by public examination.

After her husband's death in 1949, Graziela began her formal education at the Universidade da Guanabara studying natural history, finishing her degree in 1962. She went on to pursue a Doctorate, defending her thesis, "Compositae - Subtribo Baccharidinae Hoffman - Estudo das espécies ocorrentes no Brasil", in 1973.
