= Boissevain (disambiguation) =

Boissevain may refer to:

== People ==
- Boissevain family, Dutch patrician family
  - Adolphe Boissevain, (1843–1921), Dutch banker
  - Charles Boissevain (1842–1927), Dutch journalist and newspaper editor
  - Charles H. Boissevain (1893–1946), Dutch tuberculosis researcher and botanist
  - Mia Boissevain (1878–1959), Dutch malacologist and feminist
  - Willem Frederik Lamoraal Boissevain (1852–1919), Dutch colonial administrator
- Angie Boissevain (born 1936), American Zen Buddhist priest
- Daniël Boissevain (born 1969), Dutch actor
- Jeremy Boissevain (1928–2015), Dutch anthropologist
- Mies Boissevain-van Lennep (1896–1965), Dutch resistance hero
- Philippe Boissevain (born 2000), Dutch cricketer
- Rhoda Elsie Boissevain (1918–1999), West Australian portrait painter
- Ursul Philip Boissevain (1855–1930), Dutch historian and professor
- William Boissevain (1927–2023), West Australian portrait painter

== Places ==
- Boissevain, Manitoba, Canada
- Boissevain, Virginia, United States

== Ships ==
- Boissevain (ship, 1937)
- Boissevain (ship, 1947)
