= Mesa Verde (disambiguation) =

Mesa Verde National Park is a national park in Montezuma County, Colorado, U.S.

Mesa Verde (which means "green table" in English) may also refer to:

- Mesa Verde, California, a census-designated place in Riverside County
- Mesa Verde (Costa Mesa), a neighborhood of Costa Mesa, California
- Mesa Verde Middle School (Moorpark), a middle school in Moorpark, California
- Mesa Verde Middle School (Rancho Peñasquitos), a middle school in Rancho Peñasquitos, San Diego, California
- Mesa Verde High School, a high school in Citrus Heights, California
- Mesa Verde region, a portion of the Colorado plateau to the north of the San Juan river
- Mesa Verde cactus
- USS Mesa Verde (LPD-19)
- Mesa Verde Bank and Trust, a fictional financial institution in the television series Better Call Saul
