= National liberation skirt =

Patchwork garment commemorating the end of WWII in the Netherlands

External videos
- "Feestrok overdracht" by Atria Institute (2009)

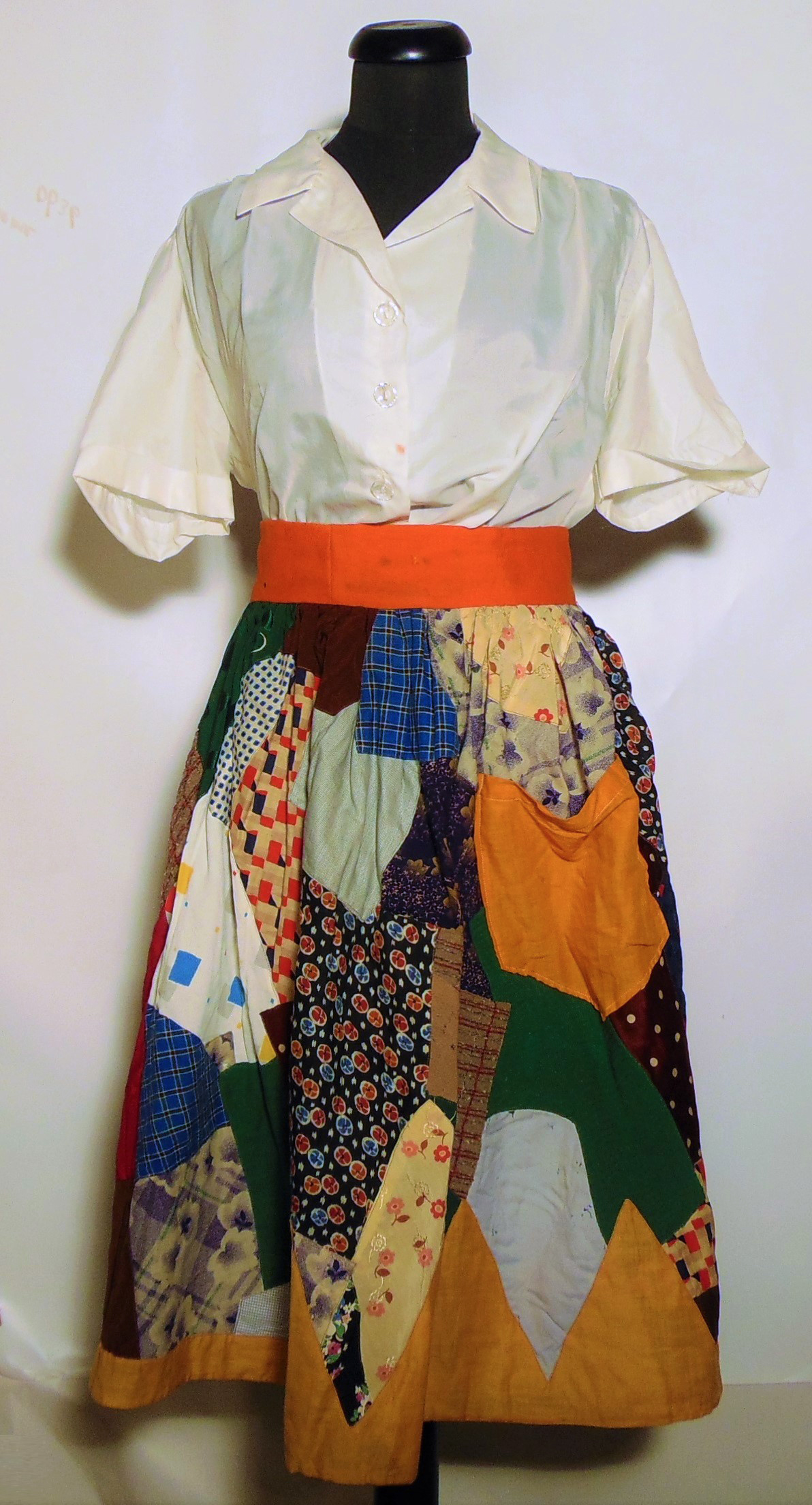
A skirt with embroidered "4 May 1946" & "4 May 1947" – the dates when the skirt was worn. In the collection of the National Liberation Museum 1944-1945.

A national liberation skirt (Dutch: nationale bevrijdingsrok) or national celebration skirt (Dutch: nationale feestrok) is a style of skirt, handmade of patchwork and embroidery, in celebration of Dutch Liberation Day on 5 May 1945. The style was invented by resistance fighter and feminist Mies Boissevain-van Lennep. The feestrok has been described as "a female mode of political expression ... [which] explicitly linked gender to the reconstruction of a ravaged country and the general striving for 'breakthrough' and social renewal."

== History ==
Boissevain-van Lennep had been imprisoned in 1943 for her involvement with the Dutch resistance to the Nazi occupation of the Netherlands during World War II. Soon after, a scarf was smuggled into her cell that had been constructed of textile patches of personal significance—including a piece of her first ballgown and pieces from her children's clothing. As a member of a post-war women's committee intending to celebrate the rebuilding of the Netherlands and inspired by her memory of that scarf, she devised a skirt to represent "unity in diversity" (eenheid in veelheid); "new from old" (nieuw uit oud); "building from the broken" (opbouw uit afbraak) and "one garment makes unity" (één dracht maakt eendracht)." She called it the nationale feestrok.

== Concept ==
The idea was that these unique skirts would be worn during national holidays and similar events as a symbol of both individuality and national unity. In the words of a song composed in honour of the idea: "Weave the pattern of your life into your skirt" (Vlecht in Uw rok het patroon van Uw leven). Through handmade patchwork, the skirts also literally symbolised the concept of postwar reconstruction.

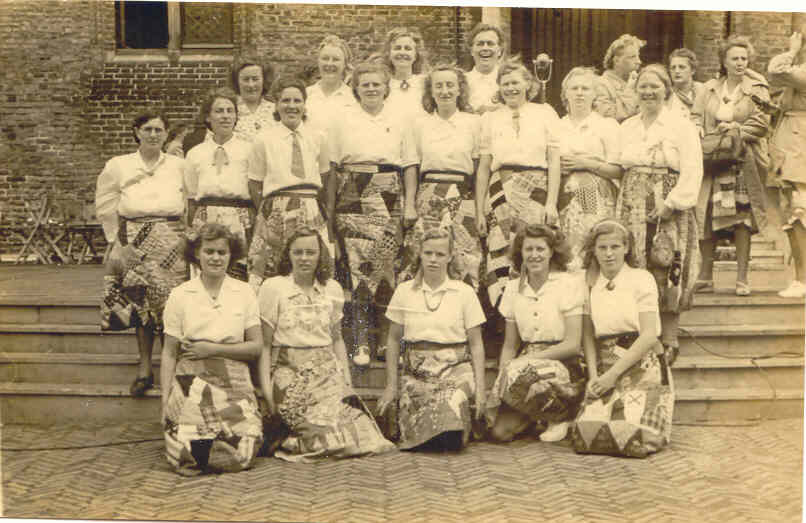
Women dressed in nationale feestrok for the exhibition "Old Ede" (1980), Ede Historical Museum.

According to Boissevain's guidelines, one was free to vary the pattern of the skirt. Only with regard to the hem did she lay down strict rules: the hem should consist of plain triangles, in which women were to write the years they wore their skirt. And everybody should start by embroidering 5 mei 1945 on the front. The rest of the pieces of the skirt were preferably to consist of authentic, used cloth and should not only be inscribed with important national events but also with important family ones. In the skirt of life the two kinds of experience that together shape a woman's life, the personal and the political, were to be combined...
Two issues are central: the Wederopbouw (reconstruction), i.e. the rebuilding of society, and the Doorbraak (breakthrough), i.e. the widespread wish to break through the restrictive old divisions of severe élitism and a religion-based party system (depillarisation).

— Jolande Withuis

To ensure that all feestrok were handmade, the International Archives for the Women's Movement was assigned responsibility for registering and numbering each skirt. More than 4,000 received official registration.

== Use and legacy ==
At the request of the Netherlands Information Bureau (NIB), Boissevain-van Lennep travelled to the United States in 1949, visiting 27 states and championing the "Magic Skirts of Reconstruction". Her preferred nickname was "levensrok" (skirt of life) while others in the Netherlands used "bevrijdingsrok" (liberation skirt) or "oranjerok" (orange skirt, referring to the House of Orange, the reigning Dutch royal family). Each had one or more triangles sewn near the front hem on which the date of the Dutch Liberation Day, 5 May 1945, was embroidered; some also had the dates of later celebrations in which the makers participated. Prominent among the colours in these feestrok were the Dutch national colours: red, white, blue, and orange. The skirts were individually registered in a national archive under the names of their makers, and their identification number was often embroidered into the skirt itself.

On 2 September 1948, some 1500 women wearing feestrok took part in a parade in Amsterdam marking the Golden Jubilee of Queen Wilhelmina's coronation and coinciding with the exhibition ''The Dutch Woman 1898–1948''.

Some of these skirts are now in the collections of museums, including the Rijksmuseum, the National Liberation Museum, and the Textile Research Centre in Leiden. The Verzetsmuseum (Resistance Museum) in Amsterdam holds Mies Boissevain-van Lennep's own feestrok.

Further examples

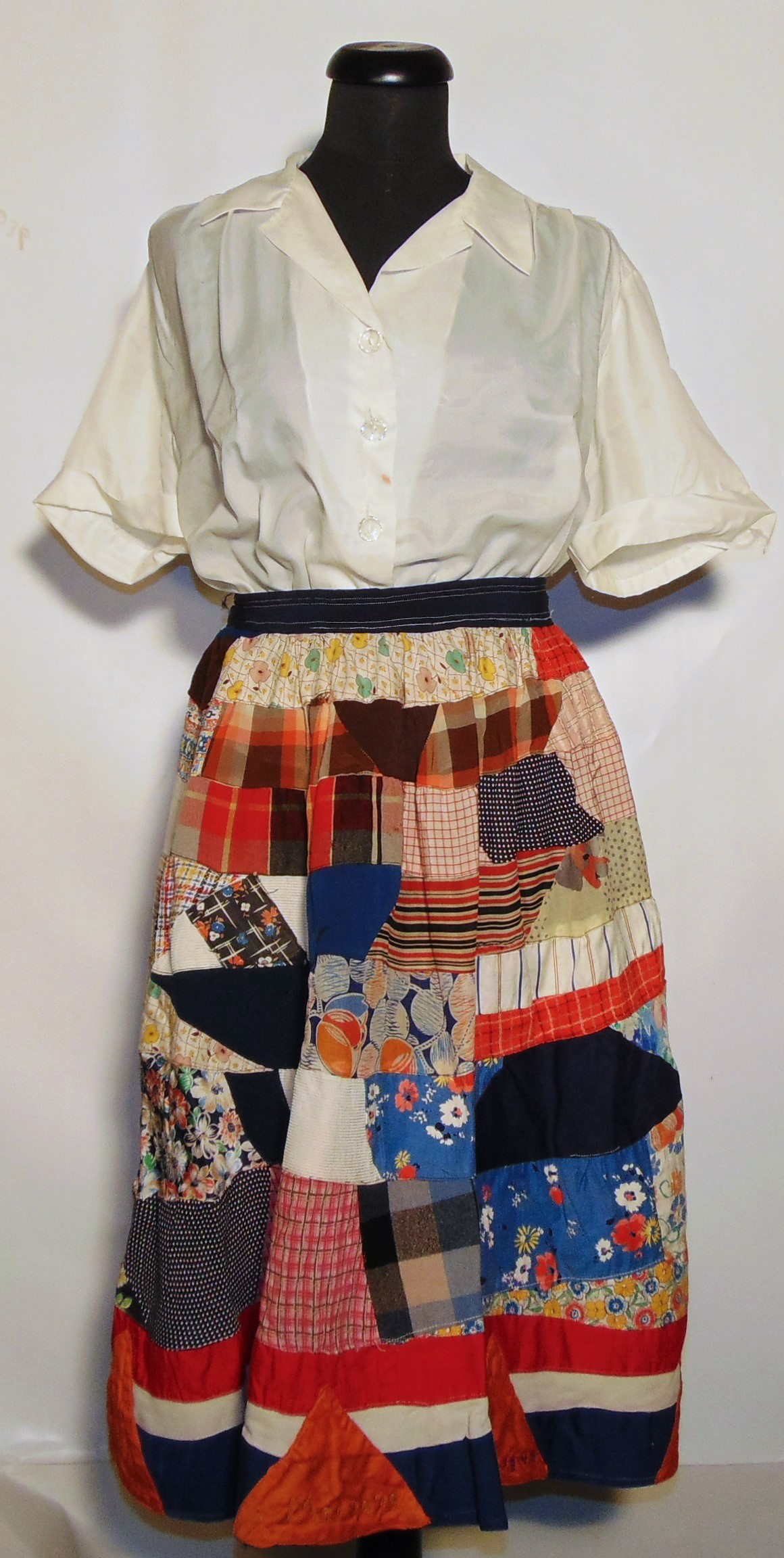

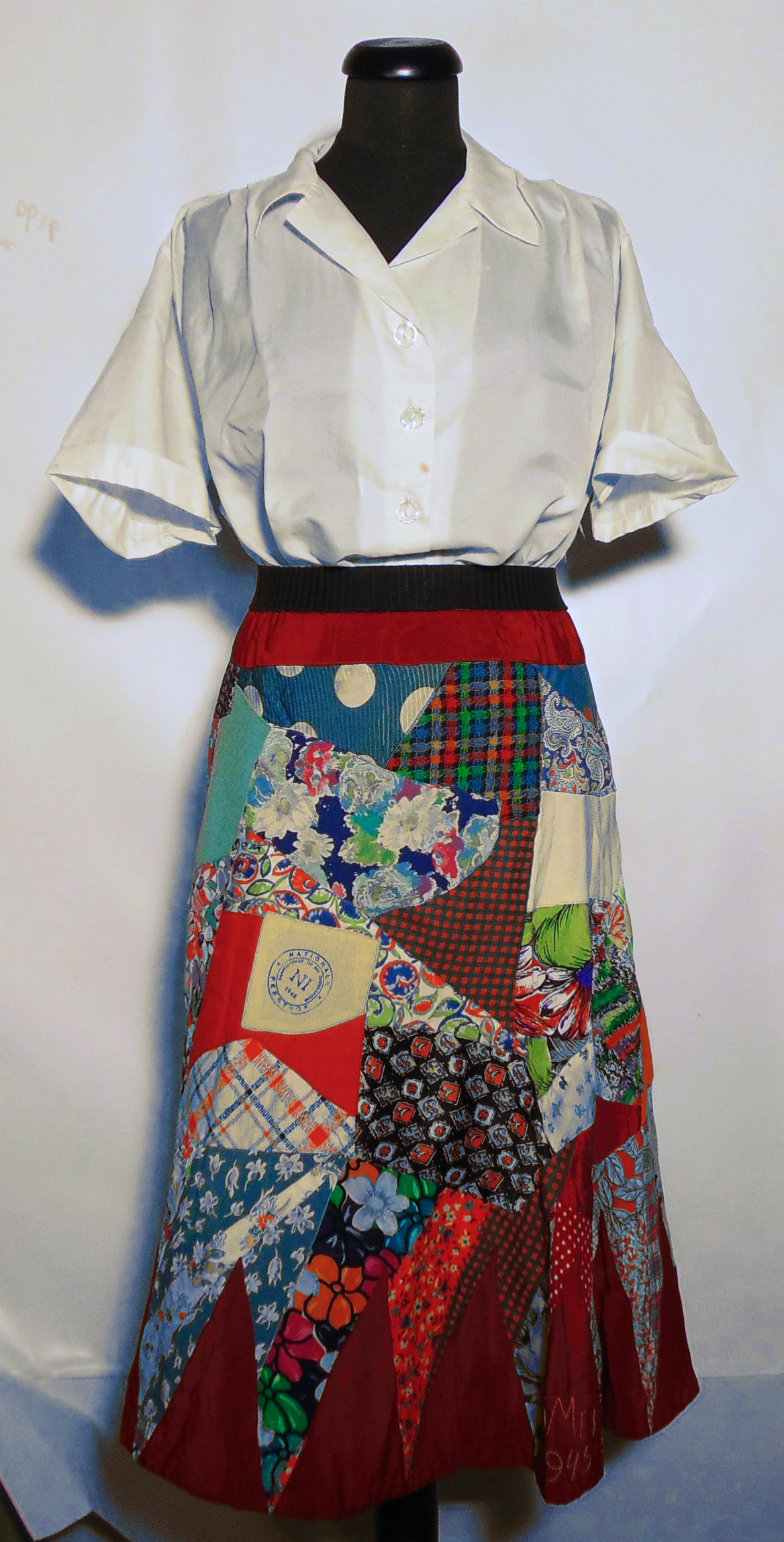

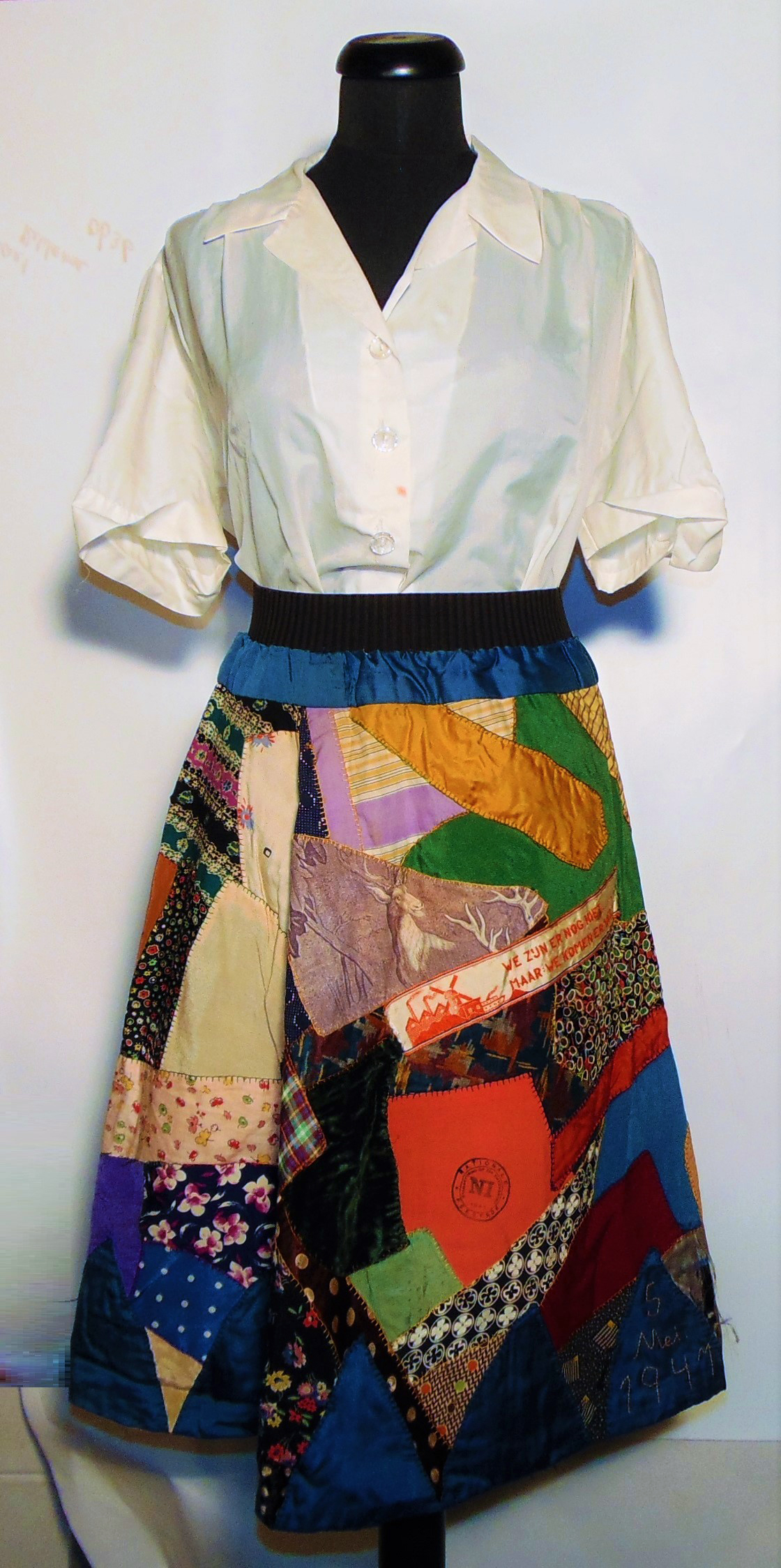

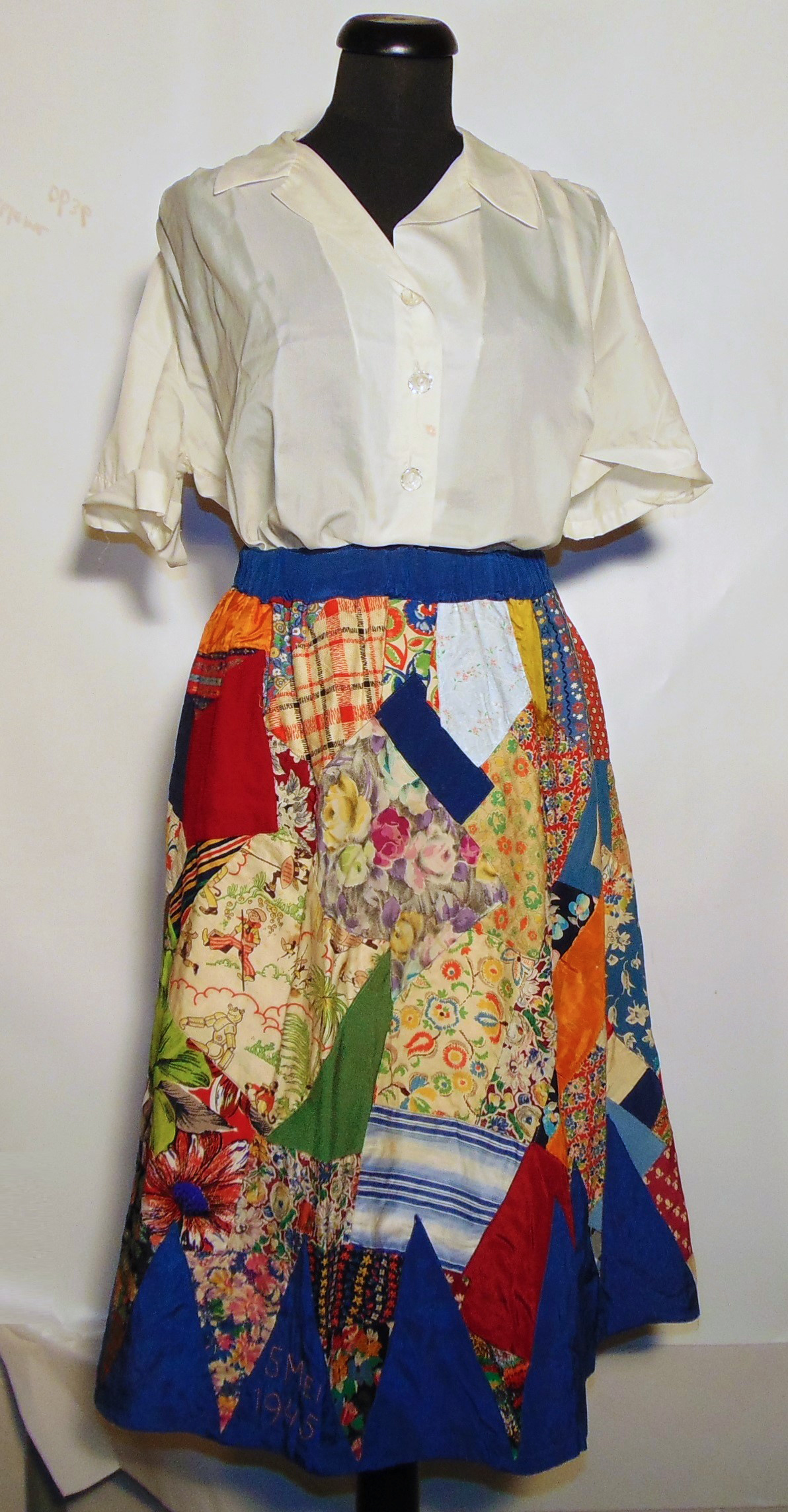

== See also ==
- Folk costume
- Netherlands in World War II
