= Shami statue =

Parthian statue

The Shami Statue
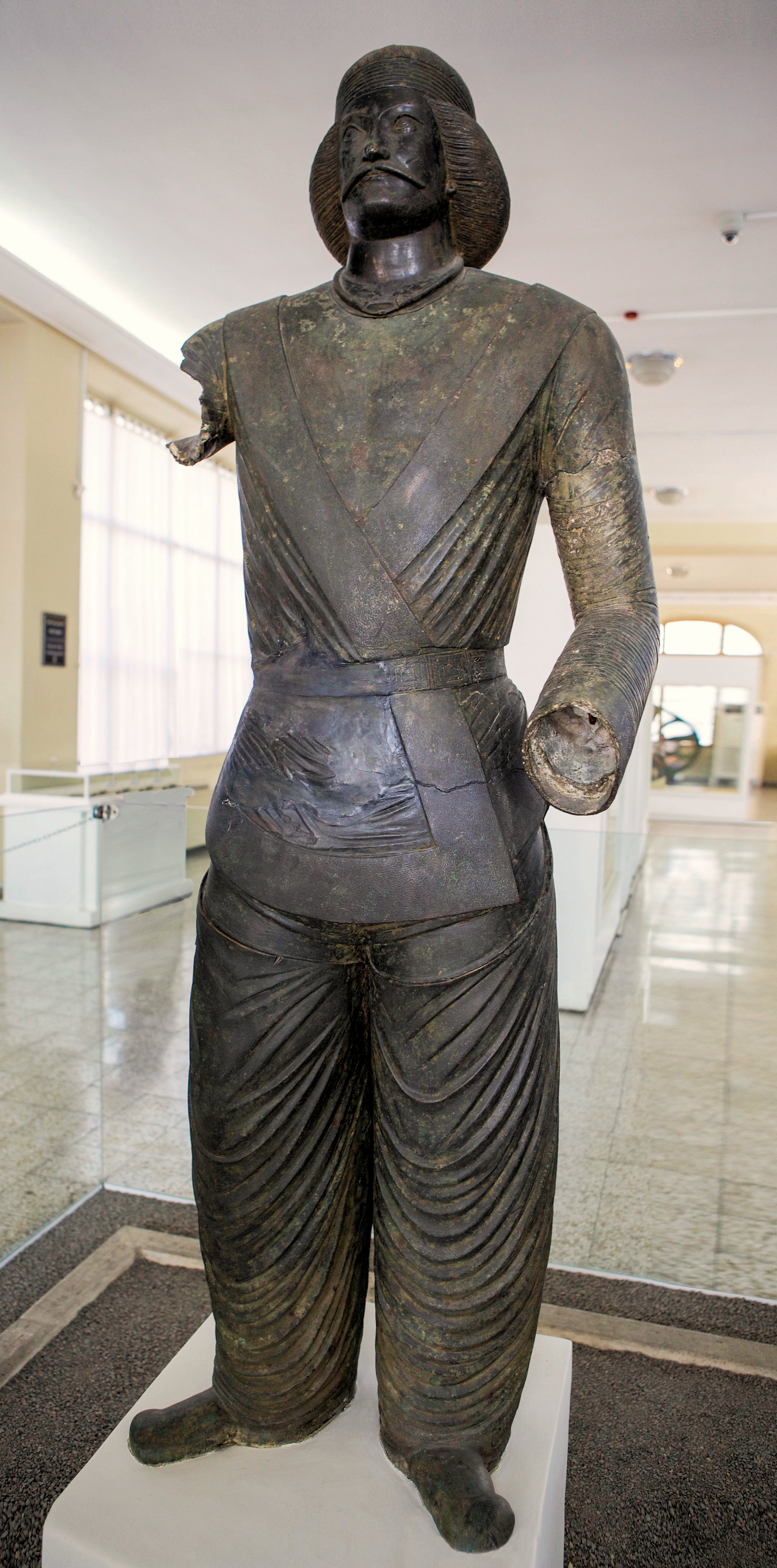
- Material: Bronze
- Size: 1.94 m high
- Created: 50 BC – 150 AD
- Discovered: Shami village, Khūzestān province, Iran, 1935
- Present location: National Museum of Iran

The Shami Statue is the most important and iconic surviving work from the Parthian Empire, housed at the National Museum of Iran. The statue is almost completely preserved and depicts a Parthian Prince or nobleman. It was found by local peasants in Shami village, Khūzestān Province, when workers encountered the bronze statue while digging foundations for construction in 1935.

Some scholars believe that the statue was originally made in Palmyra and later transferred to Susa, while others suggest that it was made in Susa.

== Details and clothing ==
The character is dressed in Parthian elite clothing, with a commanding posture—appropriate for a high-ranking figure. The hairstyle and clothing resemble those of Parthian horsemen. He is dressed in a long-sleeved coat with a V-neck tunic, and wide, long trousers with a narrow waistband—garments characteristic of Parthian attire. The style of the beard is also typical of Parthian nobility.

The statue is 1.94 m (6 ft 4 in) high. The man depicted is shown frontally. He bears a short beard and a heavy moustache, while his hair is long and covers the ears. Around the head he wears a wide ribbon.

The left hand and the entire right arm are missing. However, a bronze arm was later found in Shami, believed to belong to the statue. It is possible that the head and the body of the statue were crafted separately and put together in Shami, as the head is too small and made from a different type of bronze as to the rest of the statue.

== Gallery ==
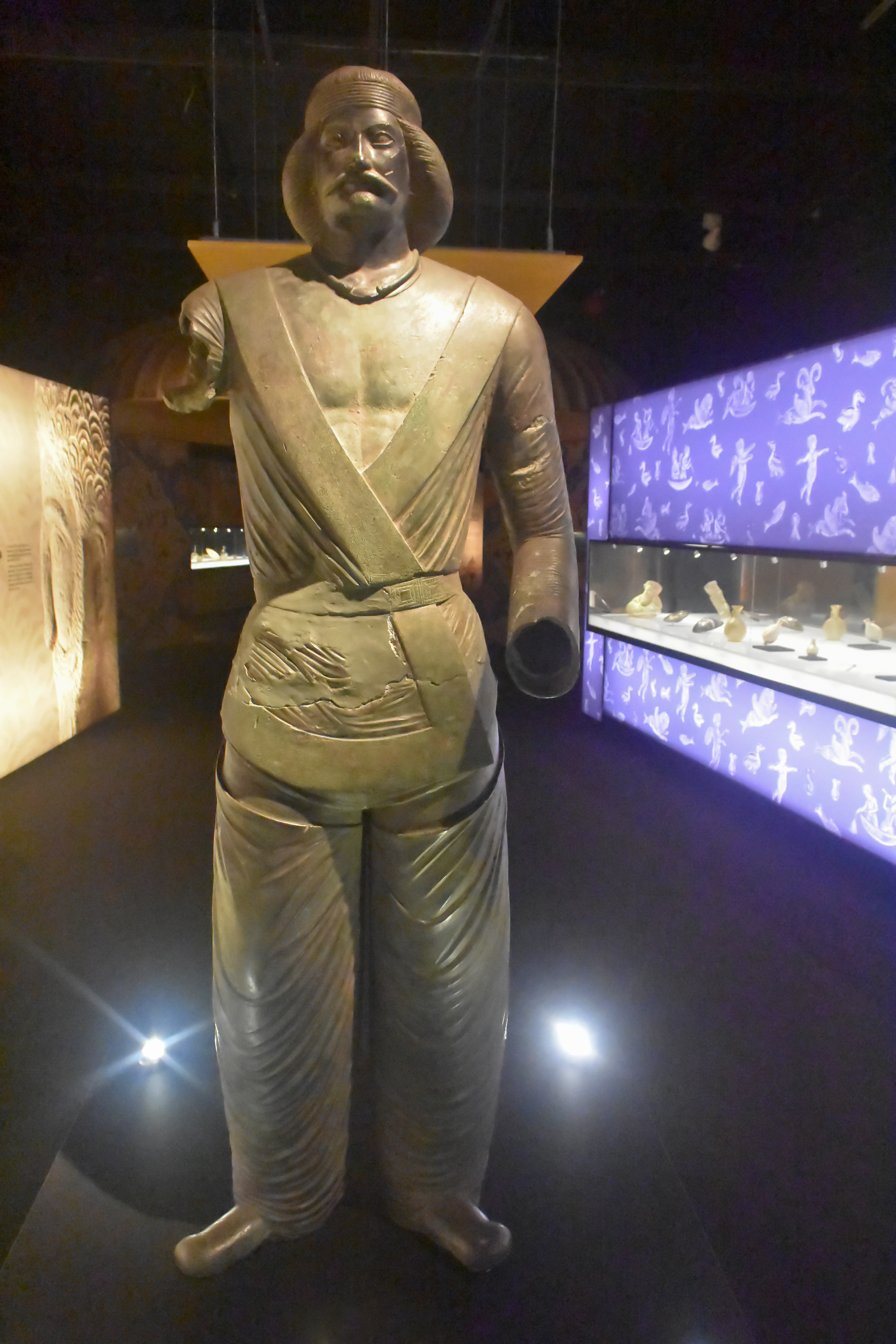
The Statue's replica on display at an exhibition by the National Museum of Iran in Spain

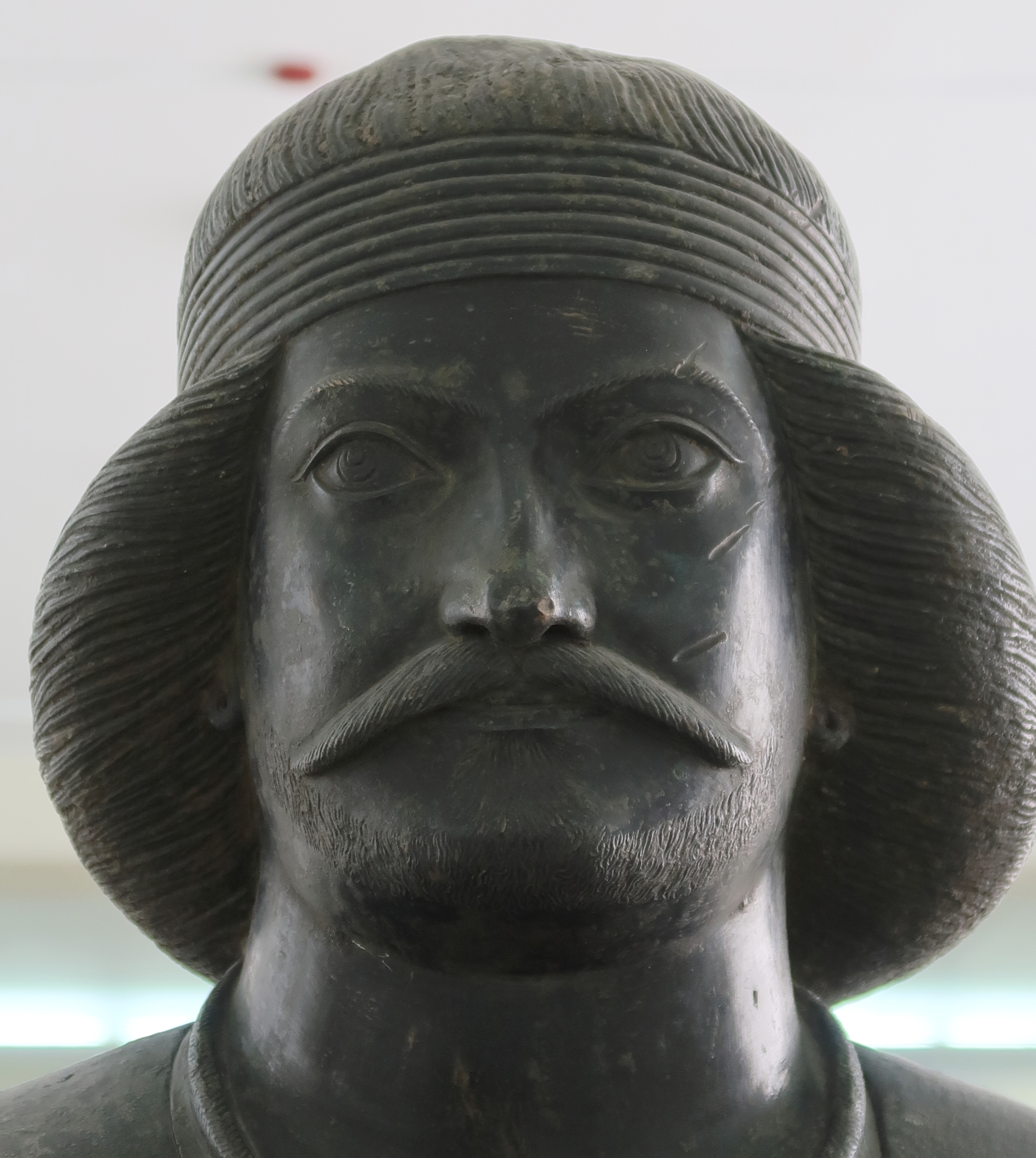
Close-up of the statue's face

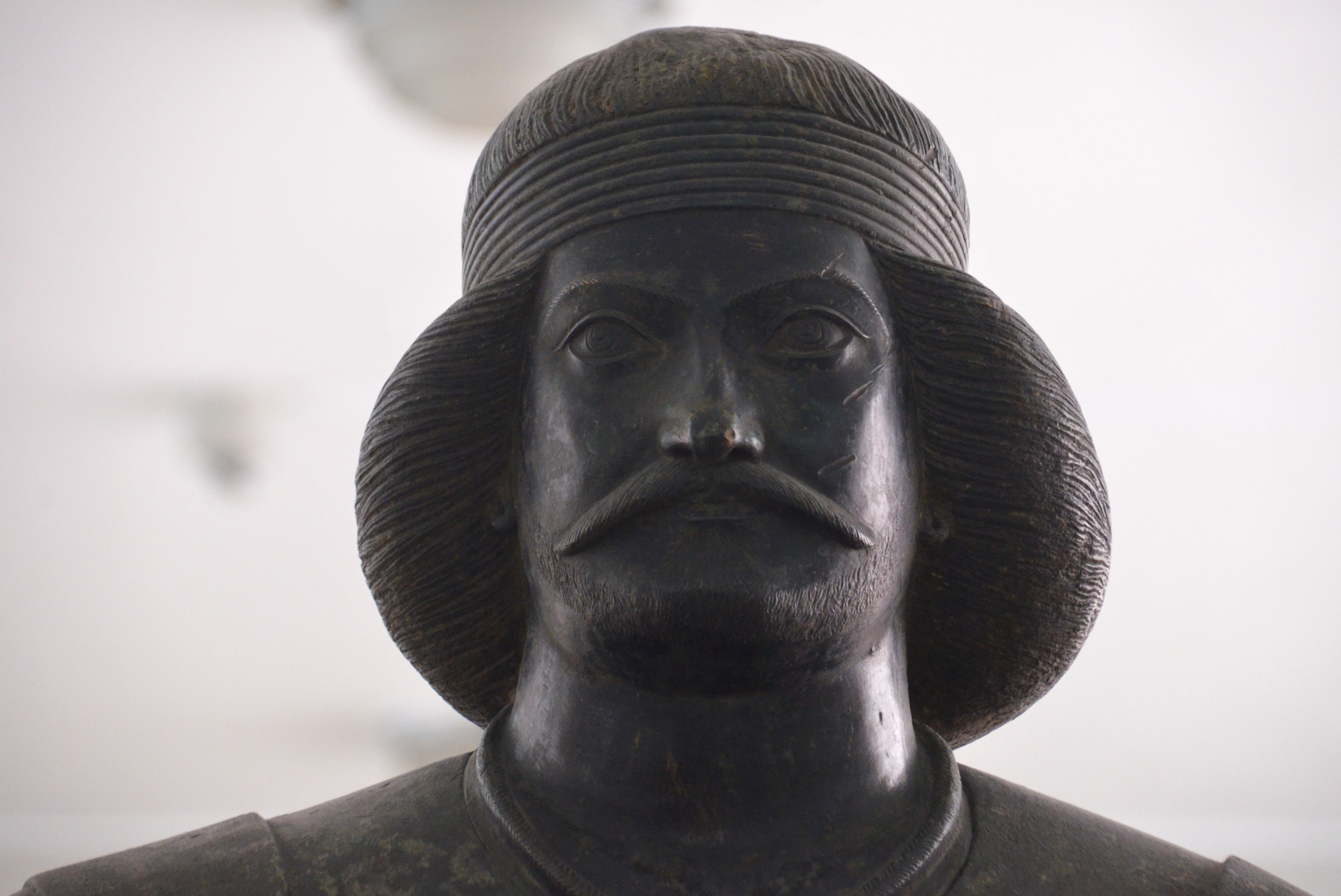

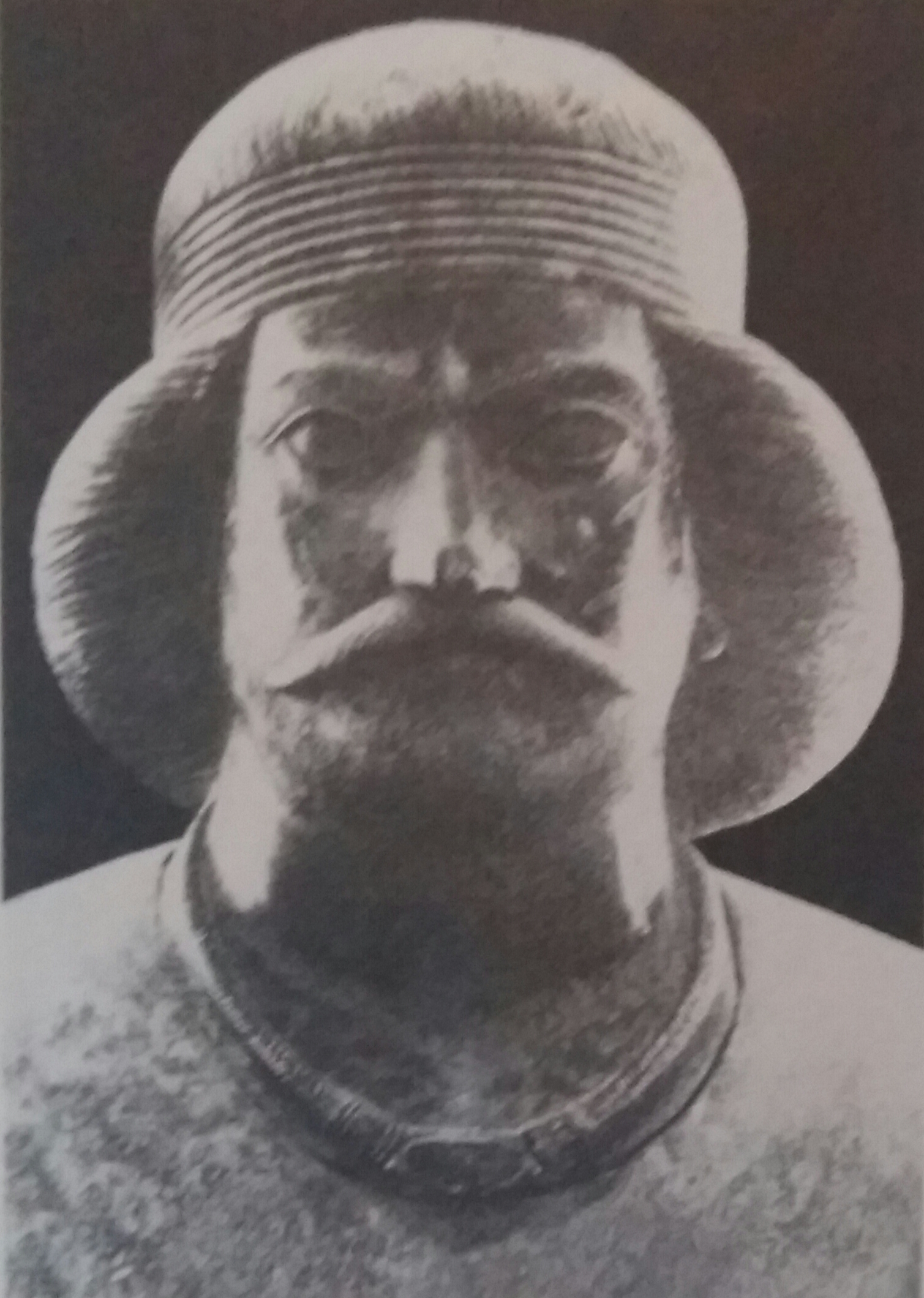

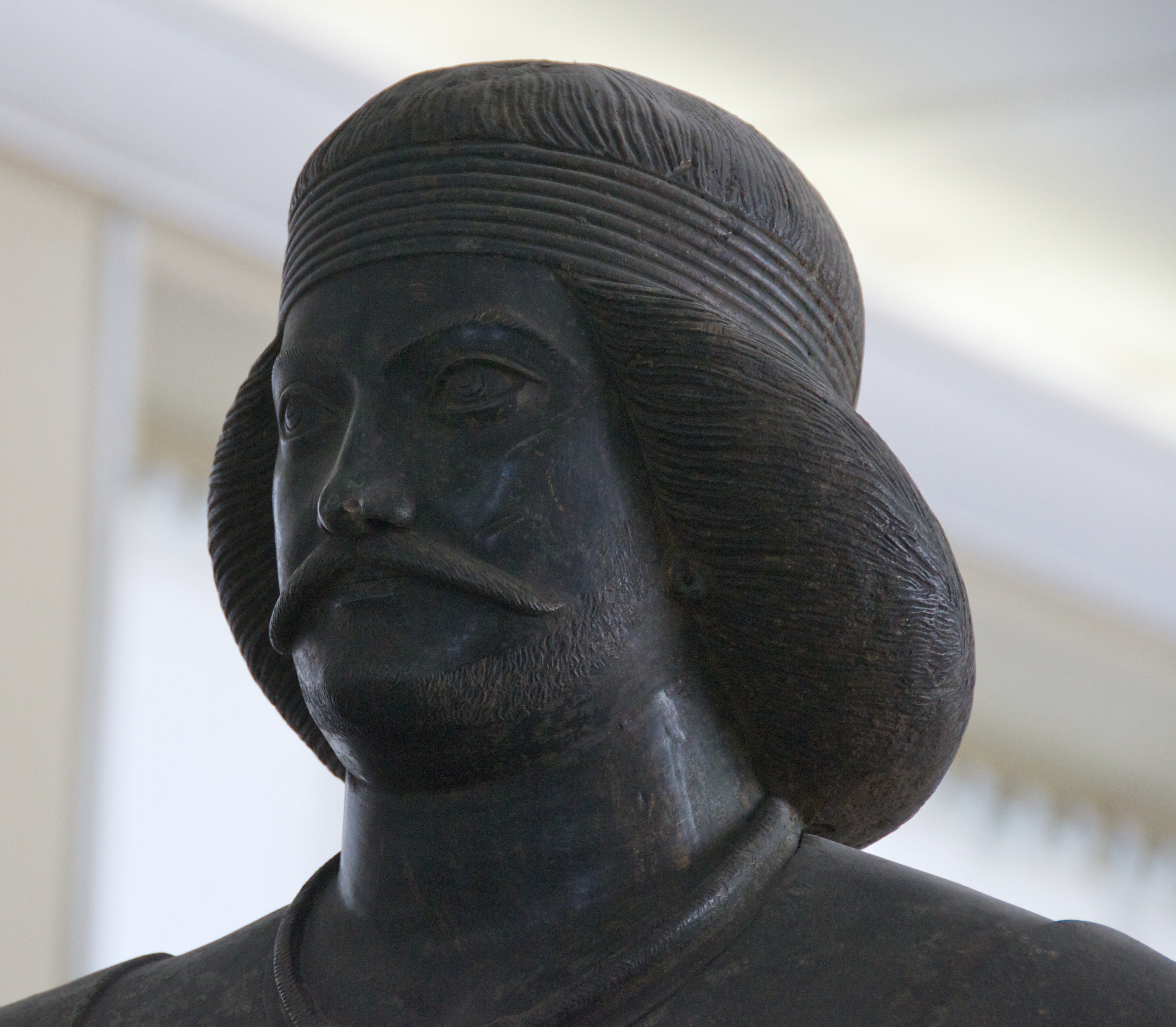
Right-angle side profile of the statue's face

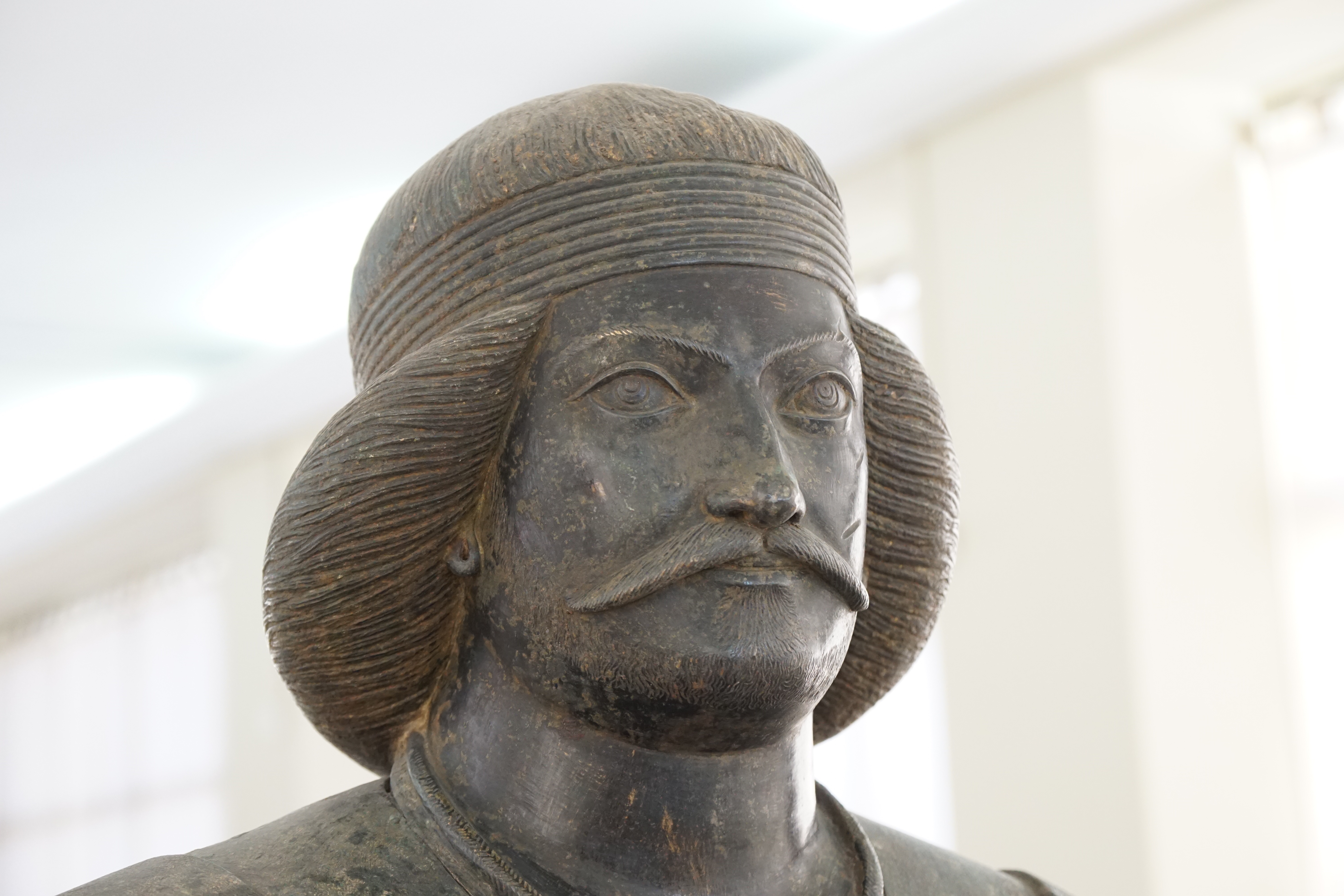
Left-angle side profile of the statue's face

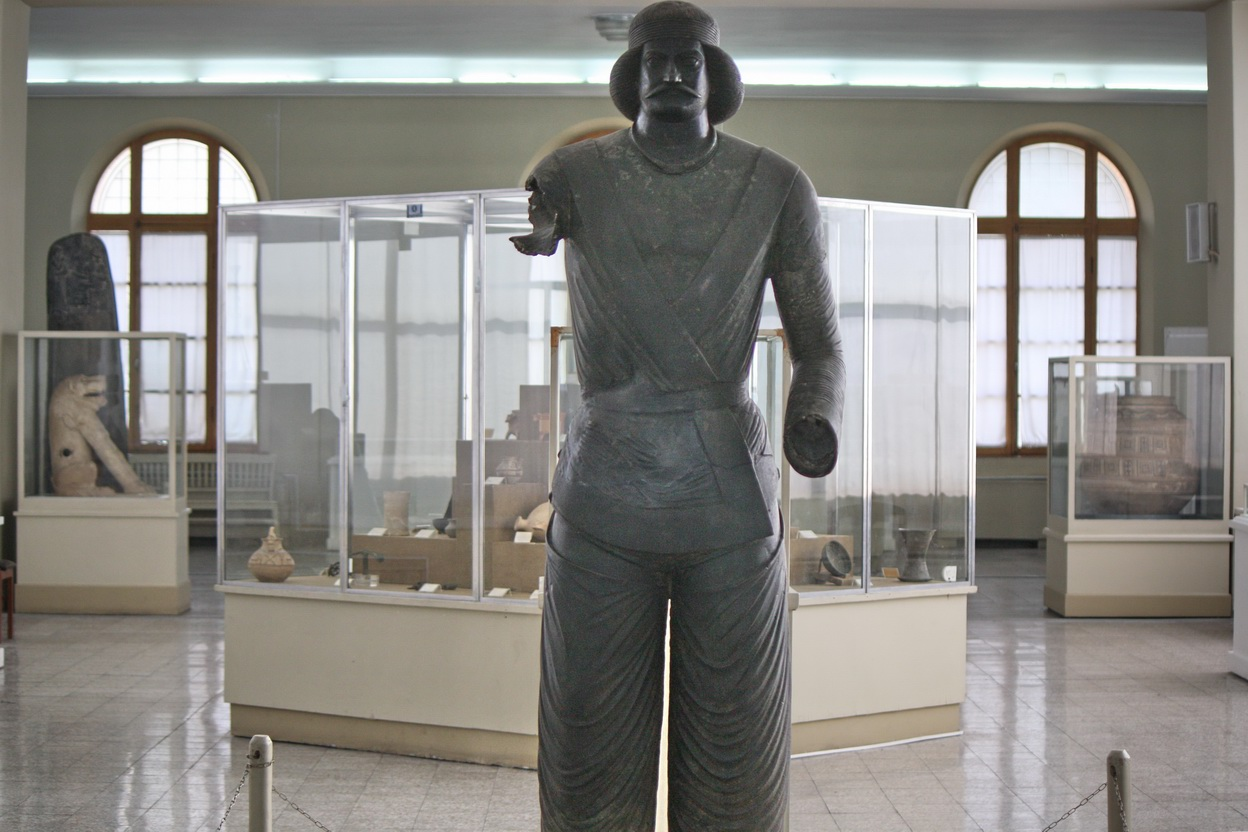

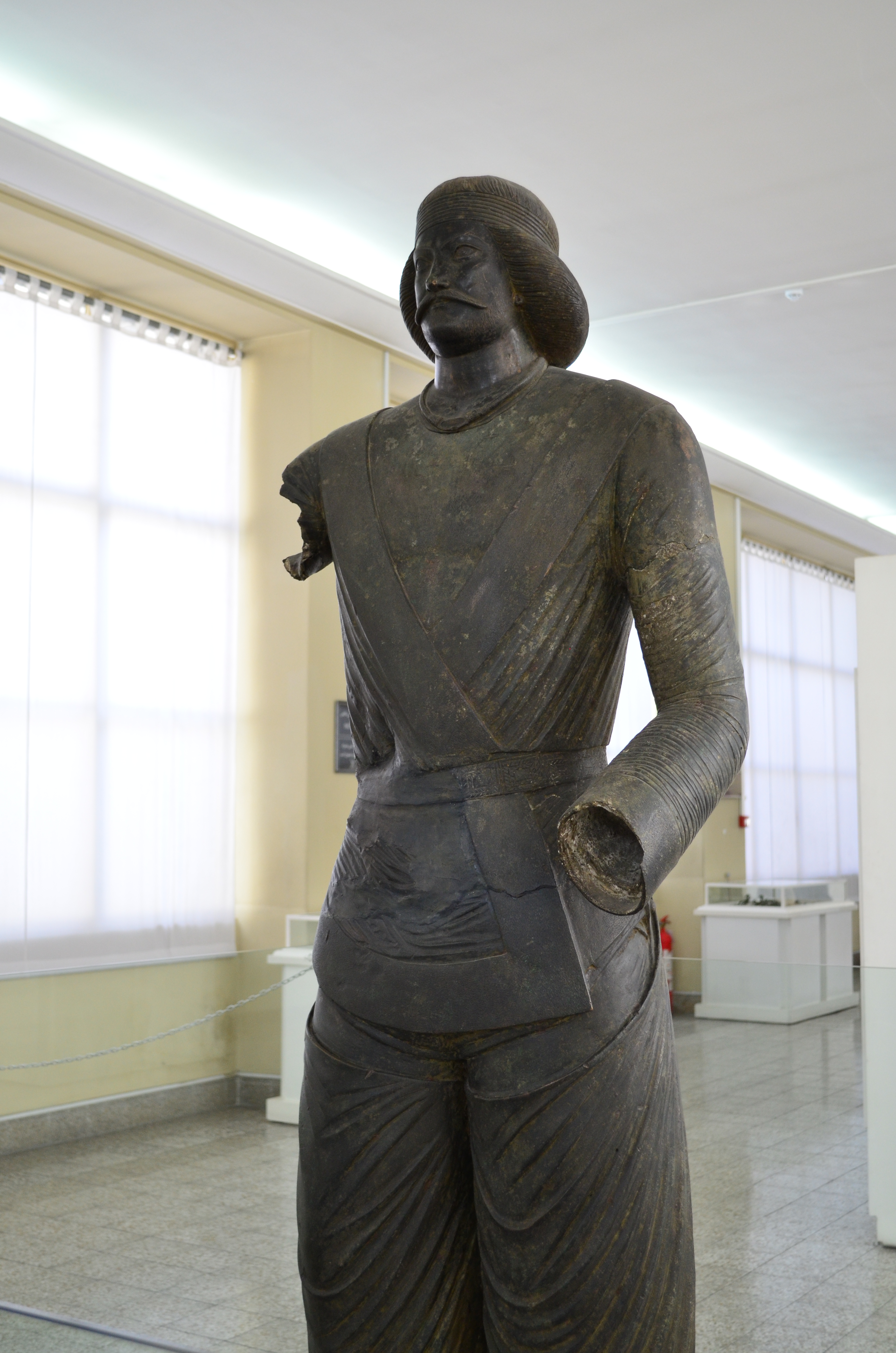

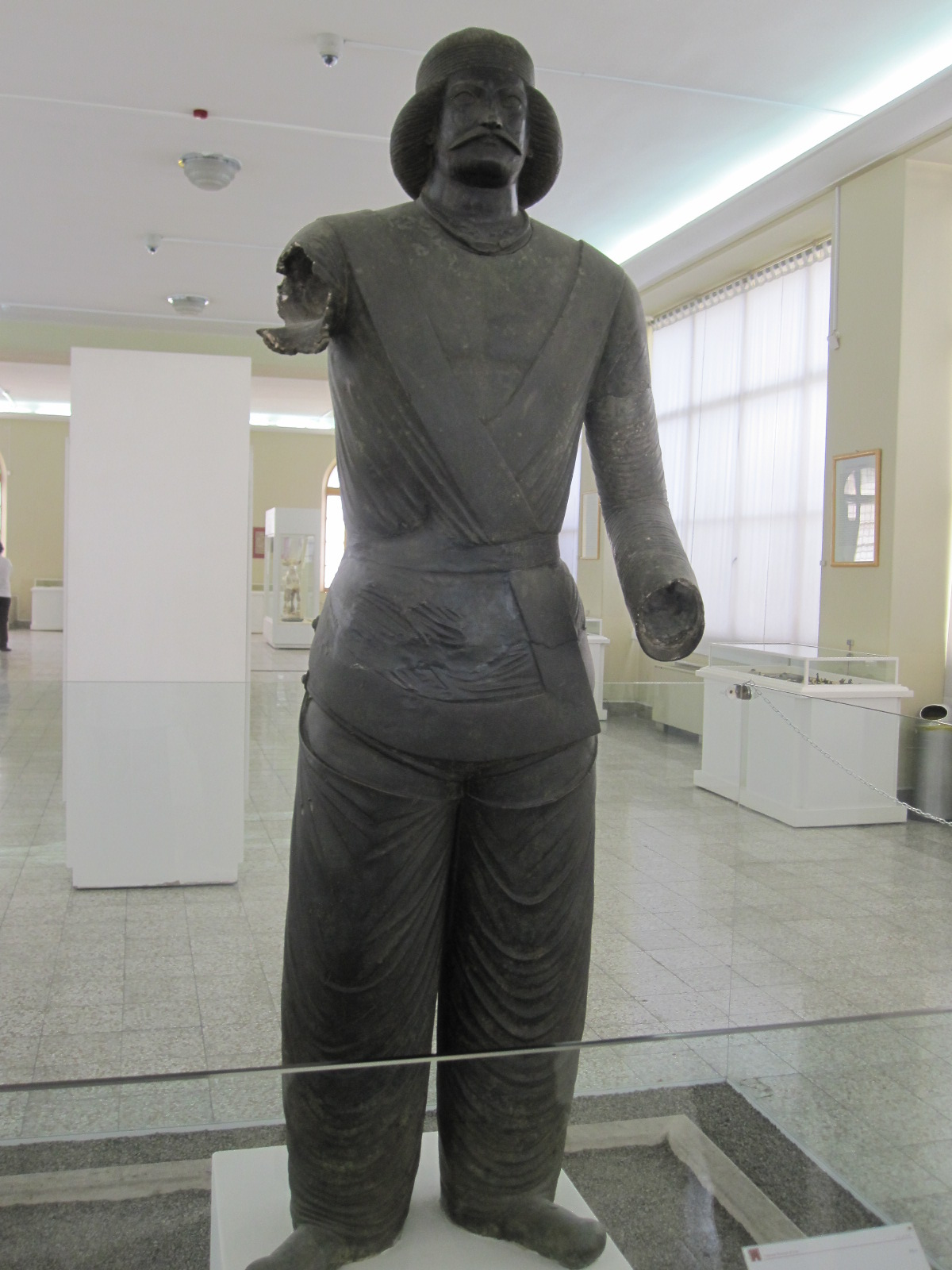

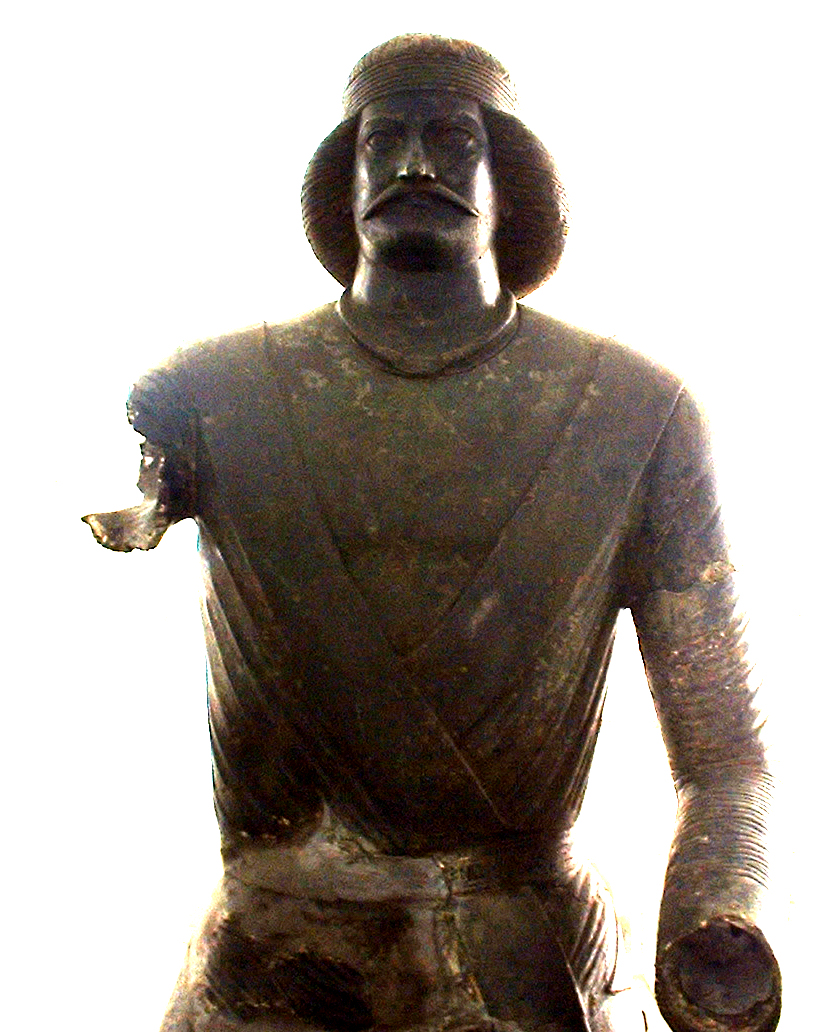

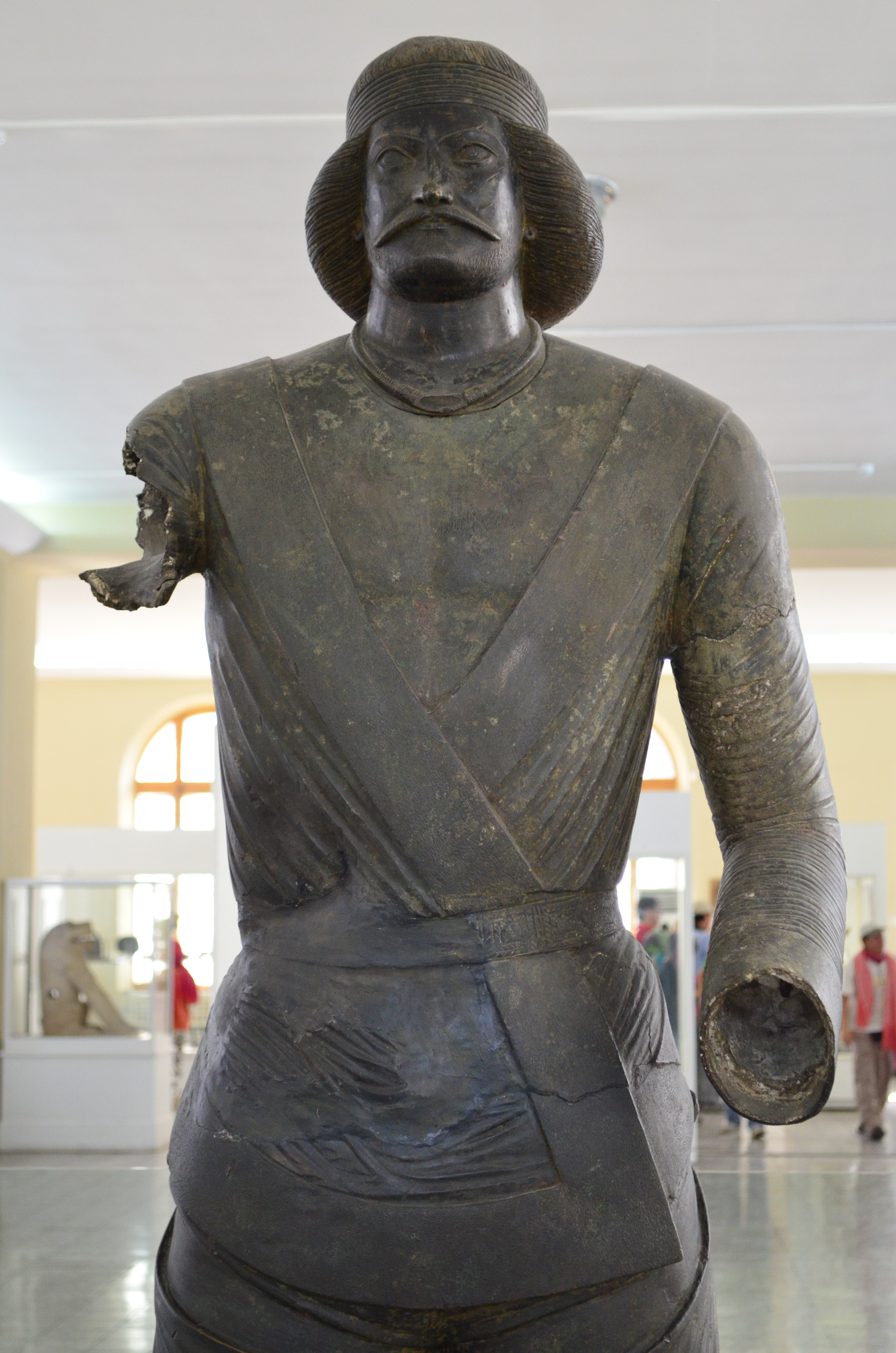

== Literature ==
- Vogelsang-Eastwood, Gillian (2000). "The Clothing of the 'Shami Prince'". Persica. 16 (31–47): 31–47. doi:10.2143/PERS.16.0.510.
- Hans Erik Mathiesen 1992,Sculpture in the Parthian Empire, Aarhus 1992 ISBN 87-7288-311-1, p. 165-167
- Curtis, Vesta Sarkhosh., 1993, "A Parthian statuette from Susa and the bronze statue from Shami." Iran 31, no. 1: 63-69.
- Lindstroem, G., 2021, The Portrait of a Hellenistic Ruler and Other Bronze Sculptures from Kal-e Chendar/Shami. Results of the 2015 and 2016 studies in the National Museum of Iran, Journal of Iran National Museum 2(1): 177-196, doi:10.22034/JINM.2021.252917
- Sinisi, Fabrizio (2024). "The Statue of the 'Prince' of Shami: Parthian Nobleman, Local Ruler or Arsacid King of Kings?". Iranica Antiqua. 59: 83–108. doi:10.2143/IA.59.0.3293983.
