= Charles Hallgarten =

German banker and philanthropist

- Born: November 18, 1838; Mainz, Grand Duchy of Hesse
- Died: April 19, 1908 (aged 69); Frankfurt, German Empire
- Known for: Hallgarten & Company

Charles Hallgarten, or Charles/Karl Lazarus Hallgarten (18 November 1838 – 19 April 1908) was a German banker and philanthropist.

His father was Lazarus Hallgarten, founder of Hallgarten & Company, and his mother was Eleonore Hallgarten (born Darmstädter, in Mannheim).
