= Willem Frederik Lamoraal Boissevain =

Dutch colonial administrator

- Born: 28 November 1852; Arnhem, Netherlands
- Died: 1919 (aged 66–67)
- Occupation: Colonial administrator
- Years active: 1874–1911

Willem Frederik Lamoraal Boissevain (1852–1919) was a Dutch colonial administrator in the Dutch East Indies. He was a member of the Boissevain family.

Boissevain was born in Arnhem, Netherlands on 28 November 1852. He began working in the Dutch East Indies in 1874, and became controller in the districts of Japara and Cheribon.

== Early life ==
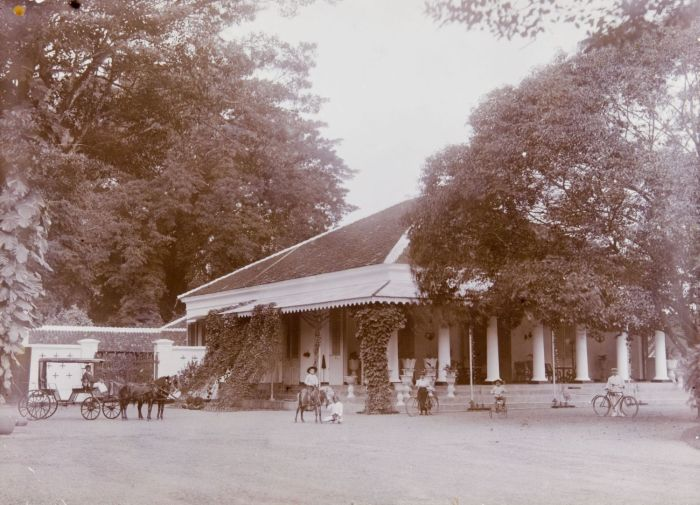
Willem Frederik Lamoraal Boissevain's house in the Dutch East Indies (c. 1900)

After sixteen years of service he became assistant-resident of Blora (1890), and then swapped this district for the districts Berbek (1892), Toeban (1897) and Toeloeng Agoeng (1899). Mainly in the districts of Blora and Toeban did he have the opportunity to show himself to be a good policeman. More than 28 years passed after his entrance into office before Boissevain was appointed as resident of Madioen. After 4 years of having ruled the Madioen district, Boissevain was called away by the government in 1907, to the more developed district Preanger-Regencies.

== Colonial government ==
For four years, from 1907 until 1911 (only interrupted by a half year leave to Europe, while retaining his position), he oversaw the district. The ruling of the Preanger people had slowly gone slack, business was merely sustained; administration was kept, but it wasn't governed and among the local bureaucrats a sort of family-government was created with disastrous results. Boissevain put an end to this and when he resigned in 1911, he could hand over the governing of the district to his successor in a much better condition than in which he had received it.

== Retirement ==
After retiring Boissevain oversaw the affairs of the corps Internal Affairs, as he was on the committee of the Union of Civil Servants in Internal Affairs for quite a while. He applied for retirement early in 1911, at 58 years of age. As resident of Madioen he received the Cross of the Dutch Lion.
