= Willem Vogelsang =

Dutch linguist

- Born: ca. 1956; Medemblik, Netherlands
- Alma mater: University of Groningen (PhD)
- Military career
- Allegiance: Dutch Armed Forces; International Institute for Asian Studies at the University of Leiden
- Service years: Retired in 2021
- Rank: Deputy director Lieutenant Colonel
- Other work: University of Leiden

Willem Vogelsang (born 1956 in Medemblik) was the deputy director of the International Institute for Asian Studies at the University of Leiden in the Netherlands. He was also lieutenant colonel in the Dutch armed forces as Project Coordinator for Cultural Affairs, part of the Civil Military Cooperation (CIMIC). He retired per 1 January 2021.

== Early life and education ==
Vogelsang specialises in the history and cultures of Central Asia, Iran and Afghanistan. He has written numerous books and articles on the subject. In the 1970s he studied Indian and Iranian languages and cultures at the University of Leiden. He also studied at the University of Cambridge and the Ghent University, Belgium. During his studies, he spent time in Iran, Syria and Afghanistan, where he conducted archaeological fieldwork, notably in the Afghan province of Kandahar. During Christmas 1979 the Soviet Union invaded Afghanistan, and Vogelsang, who by then had returned to The Netherlands, co-founded the Dutch Afghanistan Committee. He also established contacts with Dutch national newspapers and periodicals with the suggestion that he worked for them in Afghanistan. They agreed, and by the summer of 1982 Vogelsang managed to have himself smuggled into Afghanistan where he joined the Mujahedin and travelled across large parts of the country. During this period he regularly sent back radio interviews and written articles to The Netherlands.

In march of 1990 Vogelsang obtained his PhD degree at the University of Groningen in The Netherlands by defending his thesis titled "The Iranian Achaemenid Empire: Investigation Into the Establishment and Organization of Persian Achaemenid Domination of the Iranian Plateau and Beyond".

== Career ==
Until 2002, Vogelsang was the Executive Secretary at the Universiteit Leiden of the Research School for Asian, African, and Amerindian Studies (CNWS). During those years, he travelled widely in the Middle East, most notably in Iran, where, together with his wife, Dr. Gillian Vogelsang-Eastwood, he conducted a survey of local clothing traditions. From 2002 until 2008 he was curator at the National Museum of Ethnology in Leiden, where he was responsible for the Central and Southwest Asian collections. At the same time, after 9/11, he frequently visited Afghanistan, in various capacities. He was appointed, for example, as Project Coordinator for Cultural Affairs, CIMIC, for the Dutch armed forces, with the rank of lieutenant-colonel. He is an advisor to the National Museum in Kabul. He is also an advisor of the Textile Research Centre, Leiden, and co-editor of the academic journal Khil'a.

In June 2008, Vogelsang was appointed by the Netherlands Ministry of Foreign Affairs as the Regional and Cultural Advisor for the Dutch Embassy in Kabul, to be based in Uruzgan, South Afghanistan.

Starting in 2011, Vogelsang was appointed deputy director of the International Institute for Asian Studies of Leiden University.

== Books ==
- "The Iranian Achaemenid empire: investigations into the establishment and organisation of Persian Achaemenid domination on the Iranian Plateau and beyond", PhD thesis Groningen 1990, 331 p.
- The rise and organisation of the Achaemenid Empire: the eastern Iranian evidence, 1992, 344 p., Brill Publishers - Leiden, ISBN 90-04-09682-5
- Afghanistan: mensen, politiek, economie, cultuur, milieu, 2002, 74 p., Koninklijk Instituut voor de Tropen - Amsterdam, NOVIB - The Hague, ISBN 90-6832-397-0. Revised edition 2010, 125 p.
- Afghanistan: een geschiedenis, 2007 (second, revised edition), 208 p., Bulaaq - Amsterdam, Van Halewyck - Leuven, ISBN 90-5460-073-X
- The Afghans, 2008 (second, revised edition), 382 p., Blackwell Publishers - Oxford (UK) and Malden (Massachusetts), ISBN 978-0-631-19841-3
- Covering the Moon. An Introduction to Middle Eastern Face Veils, with Gillian Vogelsang-Eastwood, 2008, 247 p., Peeters - Leuven, ISBN 978-90-429-1990-7
- Together with Gillian Vogelsang-Eastwood: An Encyclopedia of Embroidery from Central Asia, the Iranian Plateau and the Indian Subcontinent. 2021. London: Bloomsbury. ISBN 978-1350017245
- Together with Gillian Vogelsang- Eastwood: An Encyclopedia of Embroidery from Sub-Saharan Africa Asia, 2023. London: Bloomsbury. ISBN 978-1-350-26427-4
