= Hilda van Stockum =

Dutch children's writer and artist

- Hilda van Stockum, about 1960
- Born: Hilda Gerarda van Stockum; 9 February 1908; Rotterdam, Netherlands
- Died: 1 November 2006 (aged 98); Berkhamsted, United Kingdom
- Known for: Painting, Illustration, Writing
- Spouse: Ervin Ross Marlin
- Awards: Newbery Honor (1935)

Hilda Gerarda van Stockum (9 February 1908 – 1 November 2006) was a Dutch-born children's writer and artist. She received a Newbery Honor.

== Biography ==
She was born in Rotterdam in the Netherlands. Her father was an officer in the Dutch Royal Navy. She grew up in the Netherlands and Ireland. Her books are characterized by their vivid and realistic depictions of family life, some of it (e.g. The Mitchells) being autobiographical.

The Winged Watchman is her best-known book. It is a true story of how traditional windmills were used by the Dutch resistance for signaling under the noses of German occupiers. Two Dutch boys play a heroic role, carrying a warning message to the first windmill. The signal is then sent rapidly across the countryside by altering the position of the arms of the windmills. The book is based on letters Hilda received from relatives in the Netherlands, and has been praised for conveying an accurate sense of life under Nazi occupation.

The emphasis is on realism in her painting and drawing as well, which consist mainly of still lifes, landscapes and portraits. She has achieved a degree of fame in this regard in Ireland, and was elected to the Honorary Council of the Royal Hibernian Academy in 1983.

== Personal life ==
Van Stockum was a granddaughter of Charles Boissevain, editor of the Algemeen Handelsblad, an influential Dutch newspaper. She married Ervin Ross Marlin, a friend of her brother, mathematician Willem Jacob van Stockum in 1932. She had six children, who feature in many of her books. Four of her children are Olga Marlin, philosopher Randal Marlin, artist Brigid Marlin, and John Anthony Marlin, who took his wife, Alice Tepper Marlin's maiden name as his middle name.

By 1935, van Stockum was living with her family in Washington, D.C., and she became an American citizen in 1936.

Although from a predominantly Protestant background, Van Stockum was a staunch Catholic since her conversion in 1939.

In 1974, the Marlins moved to Berkhamsted, England. Van Stockum died there on 1 November 2006.

== Publications ==
- A Day on Skates (1934). A Newbery Honor book of 1935.
- The Cottage at Bantry Bay (1938) (Bantry Bay series)
- Francie on the Run (1939) (Bantry Bay series)
- Kersti and St. Nicholas (1940)
- Pegeen (1941) (Bantry Bay series)
- Andries (1942)
- Gerrit and the Organ (1943)
- The Mitchells (1945) (Mitchells series)
- Canadian Summer (1948) (Mitchells series)
- The Angels' Alphabet (1950)
- Patsy and the Pup (1950)
- King Oberon's Forest (1957)
- Friendly Gables (1958) (Mitchells series)
- Little Old Bear (1962)
- The Winged Watchman (1962)
- Jeremy Bear (1963)
- Bennie and the New Baby (1964)
- New Baby is Lost (1964)
- Mogo's Flute (1966)
- Penengro (1972)
- Rufus Round and Round (1973)
- The Borrowed House (1975)
