= Donald Stralem =

American investment banker and philanthropist

- Born: Donald Sigmund Stralem; 1903; Port Washington, New York
- Died: 1976 (aged 72–73)
- Education: B.A. Harvard University
- Occupation: Businessman
- Known for: Founder of Stralem and Company
- Spouse: Jean Lehman Ickelheimer
- Children: Sandra Stralem Russell; Lynn Stralem
- Parent(s): Edithe Alice Neustadt Stralem; Casimir Ignace Stralem

Donald Sigmund Stralem (1903–1976) was an American investment banker and philanthropist. Stralem worked as a partner in Hallgarten & Company and then served as chairman of Stralem and Company, an international investment bank that he founded in 1967. He also co-founded the North Shore Hospital in Manhasset, New York.

== Early life and education ==
Stralem was born to a Jewish family, in Port Washington, New York on Long Island on June 28, 1903 to Casimir Ignace Stralem and Edithe Alice (Neustadt) Stralem (his father had changed the family surname from Strahlheim to Stralem in 1901). He graduated from the Morristown School in Morristown, New Jersey (now the Morristown-Beard School) in 1920. Stralem then completed his bachelor's degree at Harvard University in Cambridge, Massachusetts in 1924. While at Harvard, Stralem participated in the Morristown School Club, an affinity group at the university. He later served on the Committee of Overseers for the Fogg Art Museum at Harvard. Stralem did his graduate studies at the Trinity College at the University of Cambridge in Cambridge, England.

== Travelers aid work ==
Stralem worked as a leading figure in the travelers aid movement. He served as president of the Travelers Aid Society of New York (TASNY) for six years and then served as its vice president. Stralem served as president of the National Travelers Aid Association and chaired their 1950 biennial convention. Recognizing the impact of his philanthropy on the local area, New York City named him as an honorary deputy commissioner of the Fire Department.

== Philanthropy ==
Stralem served a president of the United Service Organizations Fund of New York. He also served as president and chairman of the George Junior Republic Association (GJRA) and as a member of the advisory board of the Girl Scouts of the USA's New York chapter. GJRA provided citizenship training for children.

== Board service ==
Stralem served on the Board of Directors of film production corporations, including Columbia Pictures Corporation and Screen Gems. He chaired the Finance Committee of Sony Pictures' Board. Stralem also served on the Board of Directors of telecommunication companies (e.g., Continental Telephone Company, Independent telephone company) and industrial companies (e.g., Atlantic Gulf Petroleum, United States Leather Company, Stahl-Meyer)

== Family ==
Stralem married Jean Lehman Ickelheimer, a member of the Lehman family that ran the Lehman Brothers investment bank, on April 11, 1928. They had two daughters, Sandra Stralem Russell (married to Robert A. Russell) and Lynn Stralem. Jean Stralem owned an extensive private art collection, which featured works by Pablo Picasso, Henri-Émile-Benoît Matisse, Edgar Degas, and Pierre-Auguste Renoir. She also collected rare first-edition children's books and miniature furniture. Paralleling her husband's philanthropy, Jean Stralem served on the board of directors of the American Theatre Wing and Lighthouse International in New York City. She served as vice president of Lighthouse International in 1973 and then as vice chairman. Jean Stralem also served as a vice chairman of Seeing Eye's 1938 fundraising campaign.

== Athletics ==
Stralem competed in tennis against other investment bankers. He was a finalist in the 1951 tournament held by the Bond Club of New York, an association of Wall Street executives.
