= Boissevain family =

Dutch Huguenot patrician family

Boissevain
- family
- Parent house: Bouyssavy
- Country: Netherlands; France; United States; Canada; United Kingdom
- Founded: 17th century
- Founder: Lucas Bouyssavy

The Boissevain family is a Dutch patrician family of French Huguenot origin.

== History ==
The family originates from the Dordogne in France. Lucas Bouyssavy (1660–1705) appears to have been the founder of today's Boissevain family. Lucas sold his half of the ancestral property in the village of Couze to his brother Jean on 22 July 1685. On 4 December 1687 he drew up his will in the town of Bergerac, Dordogne. Because of Catholic persecution of the Protestants, he went into exile, first to Bordeaux, and then to Amsterdam (Netherlands). He settled there in about 1691, using the name Boissevain. Thus, all bearers of the name Boissevain are necessarily descended from Boussavy.

In the course of the generations the family spread further over the rest of the Netherlands and Europe. Adolphe Boissevain (1843–1921) acquired an outstanding reputation in financing companies, particularly railway companies, e.g., the Canadian Pacific Railway. Along this line is situated, in Manitoba, the town of Boissevain, Manitoba named after Adolphe.

The investment bank owned by the family, Boissevain & Company (with offices in New York and Amsterdam) was acquired by Hallgarten & Company in January 1926. It had been in existence for around 25 years.

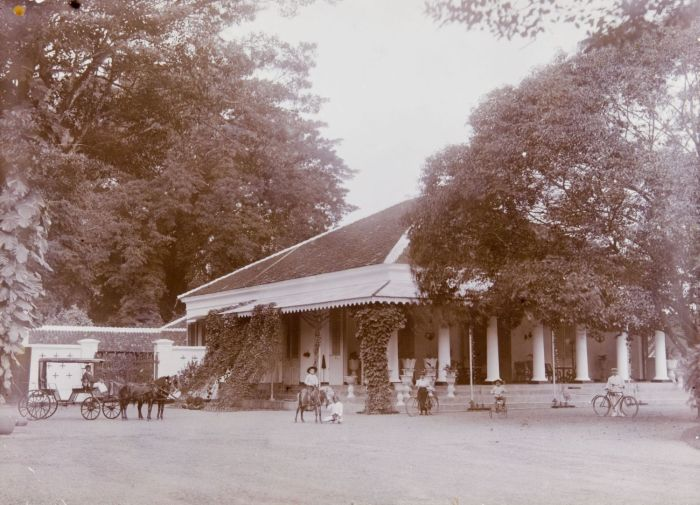
The house of Willem Frederik Lamoraal Boissevain (1852–1919) in the Dutch East Indies (present-day Indonesia)

Daniel Boissevain (1856–1929), who turned against the family wealth and became a farmer and socialist activist in Alberta, Canada contributed to the spread of the Boissevains over the North American continent, while Willem Frederik Lamoraal Boissevain (1852–1919) contributed to the presence of the family in the Dutch East Indies (present-day Indonesia).

Three children and a grandson of Amsterdam newspaper editor Charles Boissevain (1842–1927) emigrated to North America.

- His son Eugen Jan Boissevain (1880–1949), an importer of coffee from Java, married two notable 20th-century American women: suffragist Inez Milholland (1886–1916), for whom he emigrated to New York, and Pulitzer Prize–winning poet Edna St. Vincent Millay (1892–1950).
- His son Robert Walrave Boissevain (1872–1938) emigrated to upstate New York.
- His daughter Olga Boissevain (1875–1949) married Dutch sea captain and explorer Abraham Jacob van Stockum (1864–1935). Their son, mathematician Willem Jacob van Stockum (1910–44), discovered solutions of Einstein's equations with closed timelike lines, and their daughter Hilda van Stockum (1908–2006) was a well-known artist and author of children's books who married an American, E. R. Marlin, and emigrated with him (and with her mother Olga) to the United States.
- His son Charles Ernest Henri Boissevain was the father of Charles H. Boissevain, a physician who moved to Colorado, where he became a tuberculosis researcher.

In 1947 Gideon Walrave Boissevain (1897–1985), minister plenipotentiary in Greece, Chile, Israel, then Dutch ambassador to Cuba, married Maria, granddaughter of Russian mystic Grigori Rasputin, in Paris.

== Coat of arms ==
The family coat of arms features a silver shield with three green trees. Prior to the 20th century, these trees were represented in many different variations; in 1935 the family decided they would be box trees in all future uses,

The Boissevain motto is in French: "Ni regret du passé, ni peur de l'avenir" (Neither regret for the past, nor fear of the future).
