= A Day on Skates =

1934 novel by Hilda van Stockum

A Day on Skates: The Story of a Dutch Picnic
- Author: Hilda van Stockum
- Illustrator: Hilda van Stockum
- Language: English
- Genre: Children's literature
- Publisher: Harper
- Publication date: 1934
- Publication place: United States

A Day on Skates: The Story of a Dutch Picnic is a 1934 children's novel by Hilda van Stockum. When winter finally brings snow and ice to their Frisian village, nine-year-old twins Evert and Afke and their classmates are delighted when their teacher announces that the class is going on an all-day ice skating picnic. The book earned a Newbery Honor in 1935.

== See also ==
- Hans Brinker, or The Silver Skates
