= Gillian Vogelsang-Eastwood =

Dutch textile historian (born 1950)

- Born: 1957 (age 68–69)
- Education: Manchester Polytechnic; University of Manchester
- Employer(s): Ashmolean Museum; Museum of Egyptian Antiquities; Royal Ontario Museum
- Known for: Founding and directing the Textile Research Centre (TRC)

Gillian Vogelsang-Eastwood (née Eastwood, born 1957) is an English archaeologist, costume and textile historian, writer, editor and expert on Middle Eastern dress. She is founder and director of the Textile Research Centre (TRC) based in Leiden, South Holland, The Netherlands.

== Career ==
Vogelsang-Eastwood was born in 1957 and grew up in Bingley, West Yorkshire, England. She studied Design History at Manchester Polytechnic (now Manchester Metropolitan University) in Manchester and volunteered at the Ashmolean Museum in Oxford.

In 1982, Vogelsang-Eastwood worked as a textile specialist at the archaeological site of the Ptolemaic and medieval port Quseir al-Qadim in Egypt and witnessed the recovery of a complete face veil dating from the thirteenth-century. She published a catalogue of textile finds from the site.

Vogelsang-Eastwood worked on Egyptian textiles at the Museum of Egyptian Antiquities, Cairo, Egypt, and she set up the exhibition Tutankhamun’s Wardrobe: Textiles and Dress from the Tomb of Tutankhamun and produced the first catalogue of the textiles recovered from Tutankhamun’s tomb in the Valley of the Kings. She has also analysed clothing and textiles from the late Predynastic Egypt to the end of the Twenty-sixth dynasty of Egypt, outlining the origin of the "bag tunic."

In 1988, Vogelsang-Eastwood completed her PhD at the University of Manchester in England, studying under John-Peter Wild. In 1990, she was a Veronika Gervers Research Fellowship participant at the Royal Ontario Museum in Canada, where she investigated late Fatimid and early Mamluk textiles from Jebel Adda. Vogelsang-Eastwood moved to the Netherlands in 1985 and is the founder and director of the Textile Research Centre (TRC) in The Netherlands, which she established in 1991.

Vogelsang-Eastwood is the senior author and chief editor of the 8-volume World Encyclopedia of Embroidery (2016ff.), published by Bloomsbury in London. The first volume was awarded the Dartmouth Medal in 2017.

== Select publications ==
- Tutankhamun's Wardrobe: Garments from the Tomb of Tutankhamun (1999)
- Pharaonic Egyptian Clothing (2000)
- Covering the Moon: An Introduction to Middle Eastern Face Veils (2008), with her husband Willem Vogelsang
- Embroidery from the Arab World (2010)
- Encyclopedia of Embroidery from the Arab World (2016), editor
- Dressed with Distinction: Garments from Ottoman Syria (2020)
- The Atlas of World Embroidery (2026)
