= Hallgarten & Company =

Hallgarten & Co.
- Type: Acquired
- Industry: Financial services
- Predecessor: Hallgarten & Herzfeld
- Founded: 1850; 176 years ago
- Founder: Lazarus Hallgarten
- Fate: Acquired by Moseley Securities Corp in 1974
- Successor: Moseley Hallgarten & Estabrook (1974-1988)
- Headquarters: New York, New York
- Products: Investment banking, Brokerage

Hallgarten & Company was an investment bank based in New York City that was founded in 1850 by Lazarus Hallgarten, a native of Hesse.

== History ==
Lazarus Hallgarten arrived in the United States in 1849. His initial activity was as a note and exchange broker opening an office at 20 Exchange Place in 1850. This yielded a moderate income and enabled him to start as a banker. Initially the firm was called Hallgarten & Herzfeld (the other partners being Joseph Herzfeld, Samuel Neustadt, William Rosenheim and Hallgarten's two sons), which eventually became Hallgarten & Co. from January 1, 1867 after Herzfeld retired. After 1865 the firm developed into a stock and bond dealing house. The founder maintained his connections back in Europe and cultivated the flow of German capital into American railroad investments in the post-Civil War era.

Lazarus Hallgarten died in 1875, and Rosenheim and Neustadt left the partnership. Both retiring partners returned to Germany with Rosenheim (who was married to Maria Hallgarten - daughter of L. Hallgarten) founding Wilhelm Rosenheim & Company in Berlin and Neustadt founding Gebruder Neustadt in Frankfurt. Two of the three sons of Lazarus carried on the New York business with new partners (Bernhard Mainzer and Sigmund Neustadt - Samuel's son). One of these sons was Julius Hallgarten (founder of the Hallgarten Prize at the National Academy of Design), who died in Davos, Switzerland in 1883, while the other was Charles Hallgarten (Karl Lazarus Hallgarten) who died in Frankfurt am Main in 1908.

The firm became a member of the New York Stock Exchange on January 1, 1881.

== "Our Crowd" ==
The firm was part of the interlinked group of Wall Street investment banks that had been founded in the second half of the 19th century by German-Jewish bankers, sometimes known as the Our Crowd bankers. The group included such firms as Bache & Co., Lehman Brothers, Goldman Sachs, J. & W. Seligman & Co. and Kuhn Loeb.

The "Our Crowd" firms were tightly intermeshed by marriage. As Stephen Birmingham notes in his book “Our Crowd”: “At Hallgarten & Company four principal partners Charles Hallgarten, Bernard Mainzer, Casimir Stralem, and Sigmund Neustadt were similarly intertwined: Hallgarten married to Mainzer's sister, and Stralem married to Neustadt's daughters. Heidelbach, Ickelheimer & Company was founded, in 1876, as the result of a marriage, when Isaac Ickelheimer married Philip Heidelbach's daughter. At a Westchester party recently, a Klingenstein, related to Lehmans, and a Kempner, related to Loebs, were asked if they weren't also related to each other. "I suppose so" was the reply". The firm was also connected to Wertheim & Co., whose founder Maurice Wertheim had originally been a Hallgarten partner.

After the Hallgarten family faded from the scene the firm’s fortunes were intertwined to the aforementioned Stralem family.

Casimir I. Stralem (1886–1932), of 14 East 82nd Street, New York, was for a long time the chief partner in the firm, while his wife, Edith, was the daughter of another partner, Sigmund Neustadt. Their son was Donald S. Stralem (1903–1976) who became a Hallgarten partner in 1932. His wife was Jean Ickelheimer (1908–1994), a philanthropist and art collector (owning works by Picasso, Matisse, Degas, and Renoir). She was a granddaughter of the banker Philip Lehman.

Donald S. Stralem was also noted as a prominent book collector. His daughter, Sandra, married Robert Russell who was also a partner at Hallgarten from 1950 until 1966, when Stralem and Russell left to start a new investment bank, Stralem & Company, which still exists today as an asset management firm in New York.

Donald's brother, Pierre Stralem (known as Pete, 1911–1997) became a partner in 1942 and carried on with the firm into its later merged state.

Another partner of note was Arthur Zankel, the philanthropist (for whom the Zankel Recital Hall at the Carnegie Hall is named) who at the start of his career was a general partner of Hallgarten & Company from 1953 until 1965.

== International Finance Pioneer ==
The bank had close relations with German financial institutions. In 1904, the Berliner Handels-Gesellschaft, which was active in the sale of American securities in Germany had two partners at Hallgarten & Company in New York.

Hallgarten & Company claimed to be the first New York Stock Exchange firm to open an office in London. This occurred in 1912. In 1968, it was the first US firm to request membership of the London Stock Exchange. In a controversial (and close) vote by the Admissions Committee it was turned down due to the Stock Exchange wishing to restrict US competitors from that market.

In January 1926, Hallgarten took over the firm of Boissevain & Company (including its Amsterdam office). This was a banking firm facilitating transactions between the US and the Netherlands.

Hallgarten had its offices from 1922 until 1941 at 40-44 Pine Street (a ten-story building it owned). The Pine Street building was demolished in 1960 to build the One Chase Manhattan Plaza. However the firm had moved out in 1941 to the seventh and eight floors at 44 Wall Street. The firm remained in the top rank of Wall Street firms right through to the 1970s. At its apogee it had offices in Chicago, London, Paris, Geneva and Brussels. It had also maintained offices in Amsterdam, Rome and Berlin earlier in the 20th Century. It was never a mass-market firm and had a somewhat exclusive private clientele in addition to its investment banking functions.

== The Merger ==
Hallgarten & Company was eventually merged into Moseley Hallgarten & Estabrook in early 1974, which had its headquarters in Boston. The other component firm was F.S. Moseley, a long-established Boston firm founded by Frederick Strong Moseley in 1879. Shortly thereafter Weeden & Company and C.B. Richard Ellis (no connection to the realtors of exactly the same name) were merged into the structure. The holding company for this whole structure was Moseley Securities Corporation which had its stock listed on the NYSE.

Financial problems beset the firm in the 1980s, particularly in relation to the Crash of Black Monday (1987). Shortly thereafter, in November 1987, Moseley Hallgarten & Estabrook announced it would quit the retail broking component of its operations. During 1987, the retail brokerage unit with 30 offices provided just under half of the firm's revenues. About 325 of the firm's 870 employees were retail brokers. In November 1987 the company signed a letter of intent providing for the acquisition by Gruntal & Co. of selected assets of Moseley, including its retail securities brokerage business and related assets, and its investment advisory business, for approximately $15 million in cash. This deal fell through and then the company negotiated a sale of its retail business to both Gruntal & Co. and Fahnestock.

The plan was that Moseley would remain an institutional brokerage but difficult trading conditions and its connections to the so-called Wedtech scandal (the IPO of which it has underwritten) led to the demise of the firm in February 1988.

== Current status ==
The firm was refounded in New York in 2003 as Hallgarten & Company LLC by former directors of Polyconomics, an economic thinktank. Hallgarten & Company is now exclusively dedicated to investment banking in the natural resources space.

== Main Office Locations ==
20 Exchange Place (1850–1865), 28 Broad Street (1865-May 1902), 72 Broadway (1902–1903), 5 Nassau Street/7 Pine Street - Hanover Bank Building (1903–1920), 44 Pine Street (1920–1941), 44 Wall Street (1941–1974)
