= Mies Boissevain-van Lennep =

Dutch resistance fighter (1896–1965)

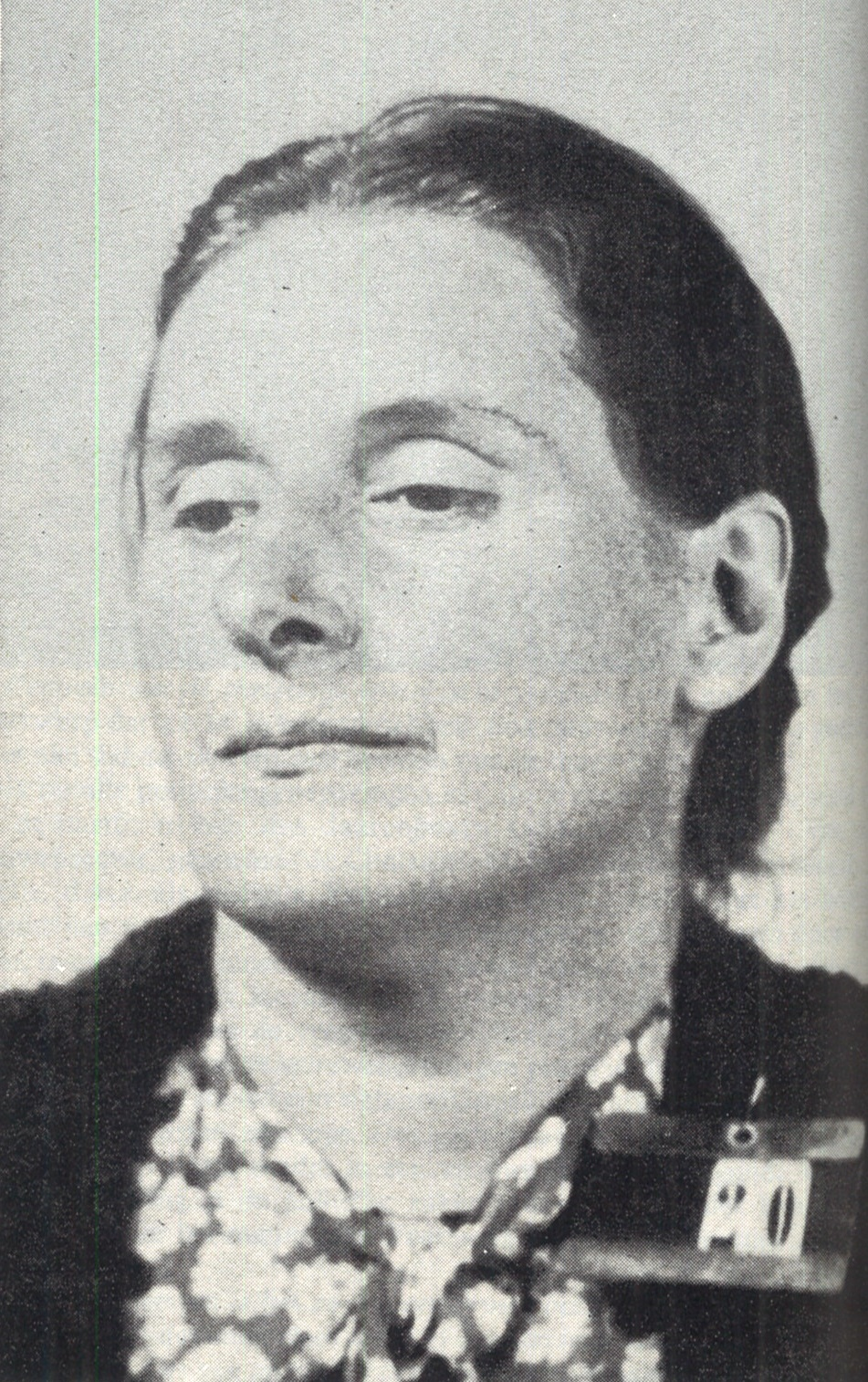
Mies Boissevain during her detention in WWII

Adrienne Minette (Mies) Boissevain-van Lennep (September 21, 1896 – February 18, 1965) was a Dutch feminist who was active in the Resistance before being arrested by the Nazis and sent to the Herzogenbusch concentration camp. After the war, she promoted the idea of the national liberation skirt (nationale feestrok), and some of these unusual skirts are now in Dutch museums.

== Family ==
Mies Boissevain-van Lennep was born in Amsterdam, the daughter of Anna Eliza Homans and Karel van Lennep. She married Jan Boissevain, who came from the Dutch Boissevain family of Huguenot origin. With her husband Jan and their five children, she lived in Amsterdam, where she was active in the feminist movement through such organizations as the Society for Women's Interests and Equal Citizenship (Vereeniging voor Vrouwenbelangen en Gelijk Staatsburgerschap).

== World War II ==
During World War II, Boissevain-van Lennep and her family took part in efforts to house and protect Jewish refugees from Nazi Germany. The house where the Boissevain-van Lennep family had moved at the end of 1939 gradually became a center of resistance and sabotage activities. Fugitives were hidden there, false identities were prepared, and explosives and weapons were stored. Her two oldest sons, Jan Karel "Janka" Boissevain and Gideon Willem "Gi" Boissevain, were members of a resistance group known as Group 6 of the Center de Sabotage, or CS-6.

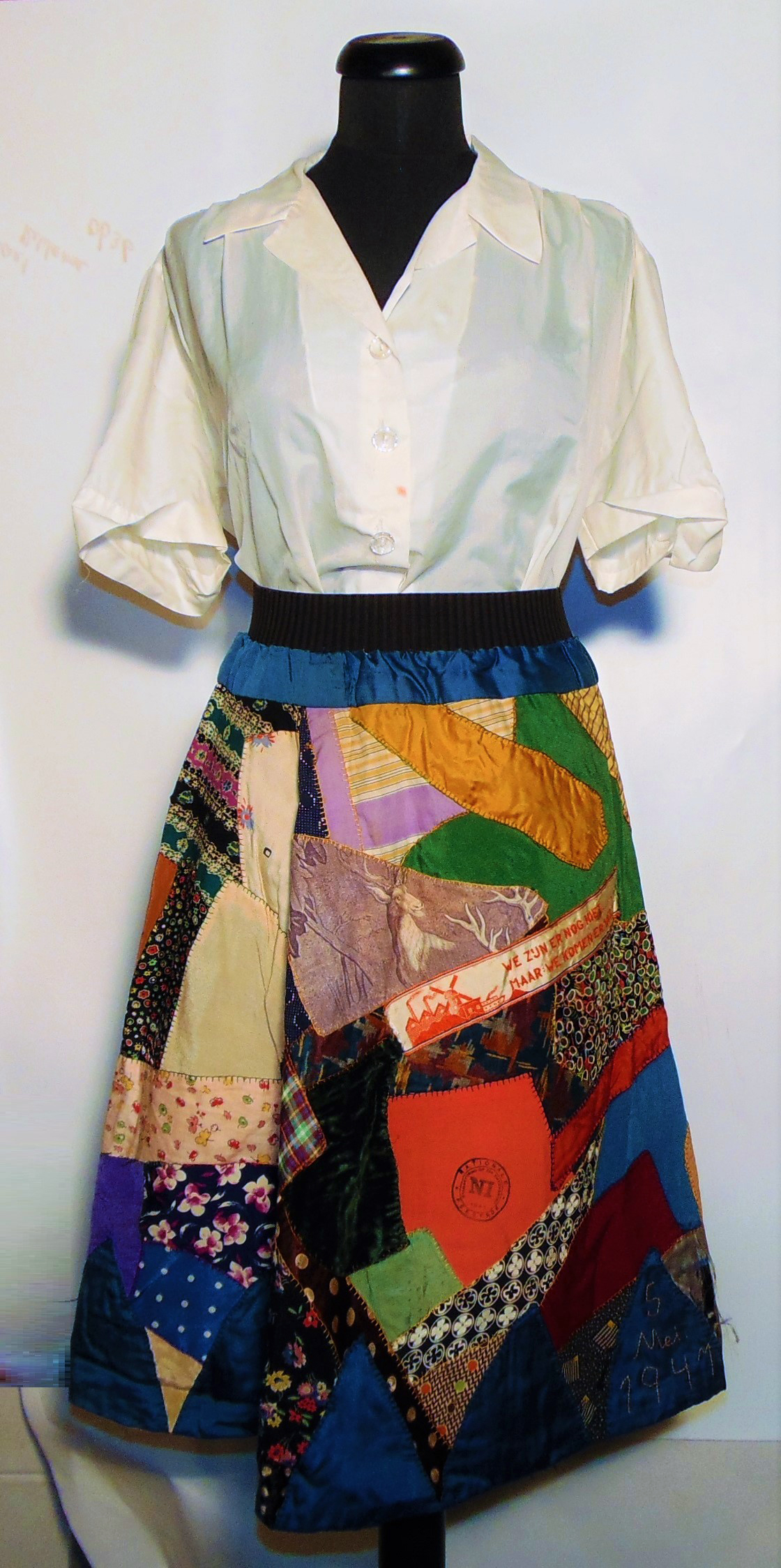
A national liberation skirt with a National Institute registration stamp, 1947. This skirt is embroidered with the dates of successive Liberation Day celebrations at which it was worn.

In August 1943, Mies and all three of her sons were arrested by the Gestapo. On October 1, Janka and Gi were executed by the Nazis near Overveen. The night before his execution, Janka engraved the Boissevain family motto, "Ni regret du passé, ni peur de l’avenir" (Neither regret for the past nor fear of the future) on the walls of his cell. Mies and her remaining son Frans were imprisoned in the Herzogenbusch concentration camp in Vught, where Mies worked in the hospital as a nurse. Among the prisoners already in the camp was her husband Jan, who had been arrested earlier.

Mies survived internment at Herzogenbusch and later at the Ravensbrück concentration camp, where she was nearly sent to the gas chamber several times. When the Ravensbrück camp was liberated at the end of April 1945, Mies was seriously ill and weighed only 73 pounds (33 kg). She was evacuated by the Red Cross to Sweden and returned to the Netherlands a few months later. By then her husband Jan was dead, having spent more than three years in various concentration camps (including Amersfoort, Herzogenbusch, and Sachsenhausen) before dying in Buchenwald. Her son Frans was transferred from Herzogenbusch to Dachau but survived.

After the war, Boissevain-van Lennep belonged to a women's group that wanted to commemorate the postwar rebuilding of the Netherlands. Mies came up with the idea for a garment she termed the national liberation skirt (nationale feestrok: a 'feestrok' is a celebration or party skirt). Also known as 'liberation skirts' (bevrijdingsrok), these skirts were handmade of colorful patchwork with embroidery.
