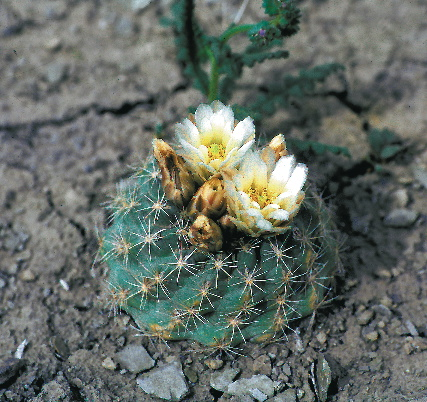

Conservation status
- Least Concern (IUCN 3.1)

- Imperiled (NatureServe)

Scientific classification
- Kingdom: Plantae
- Clade: Tracheophytes
- Clade: Angiosperms
- Clade: Eudicots
- Order: Caryophyllales
- Family: Cactaceae
- Subfamily: Cactoideae
- Genus: Sclerocactus
- Species: S. mesae-verdae

Binomial name
- Sclerocactus mesae-verdae (Boissev. & C. Davidson) L.D. Benson 1966

Synonyms
- Coloradoa mesae-verdae Boissev. & C. Davidson; Echinocactus mesa-verdae (Boissev. & C. Davidson) L.D. Benson; Ferocactus mesa-verdae (Boissev. & C. Davidson) N.P. Taylor; Pediocactus mesae-verdae (Boissev. & C. Davidson) Arp

= Sclerocactus mesae-verdae =

Mesa Verde cactus

Species of cactus

Sclerocactus mesae-verdae, the Mesa Verde cactus or Mesa Verde fishhook cactus, is a species of cactus native to northwestern New Mexico and southwestern Colorado. It is known only from Montezuma County (Colorado) and San Juan County (New Mexico). Much of the New Mexico part of the range lies inside land controlled by the Navajo Nation. The Colorado populations lie close to Mesa Verde National Park.

== Description ==
Sclerocactus mesae-verdae is an unbranched columnar cactus up to 20 cm tall and 10 cm in diameter. It has 13-17 longitudinal ribs but inconspicuous tubercules. Each areole has 7-14 radial spines up to 13 mm long, plus 0-4 central spines (usually straight but occasionally hooked) up to 15 mm long.

Flowers are bell-shaped to trumpet-shaped, up to 4 cm across and 3 cm in diameter, white to yellow with purple stripes running up the center of some of the outer tepals. Fruits at maturity are tan and cylindrical, up to 10 mm long. Seeds are black.

== Distribution and habitat ==
Along with the one Colorado population (1,000 plants), in New Mexico the population groups (4,000–10,000 plants) are in a four desert locations. These five major population groups have been registered as threatened, and there are up to a total of 10 population groups left in the wild. Since 1997 federally and 2003 globally, the species has been an officially listed threatened species. It is most frequently found growing on the tops of hills or benches and slopes of hills, from gravelly to loamy and pulverulent clay soil.

== Conservation ==
As with many slowly maturing desert cacti, the Mesa Verde Cactus has been subjected to over-harvesting and "poaching," contributing to its decline in the wild. Among the cacti, it is particularly sensitive to the effects of illegal cactus collecting due to its small population size, limited range, and low reproductive success rate. The species is intolerant to transplantation, wild-collected specimens usually die in cultivation, making the "poaching" pointless and eliminating potentially important genetic variation from the species as a whole. However, as of 2017 the IUCN assesses the species as Least concern based on ongoing protection and management in multiple locations and lack of severe population fragmentation.
