= Charles Boissevain =

Dutch journalist, editor and newspaper owner

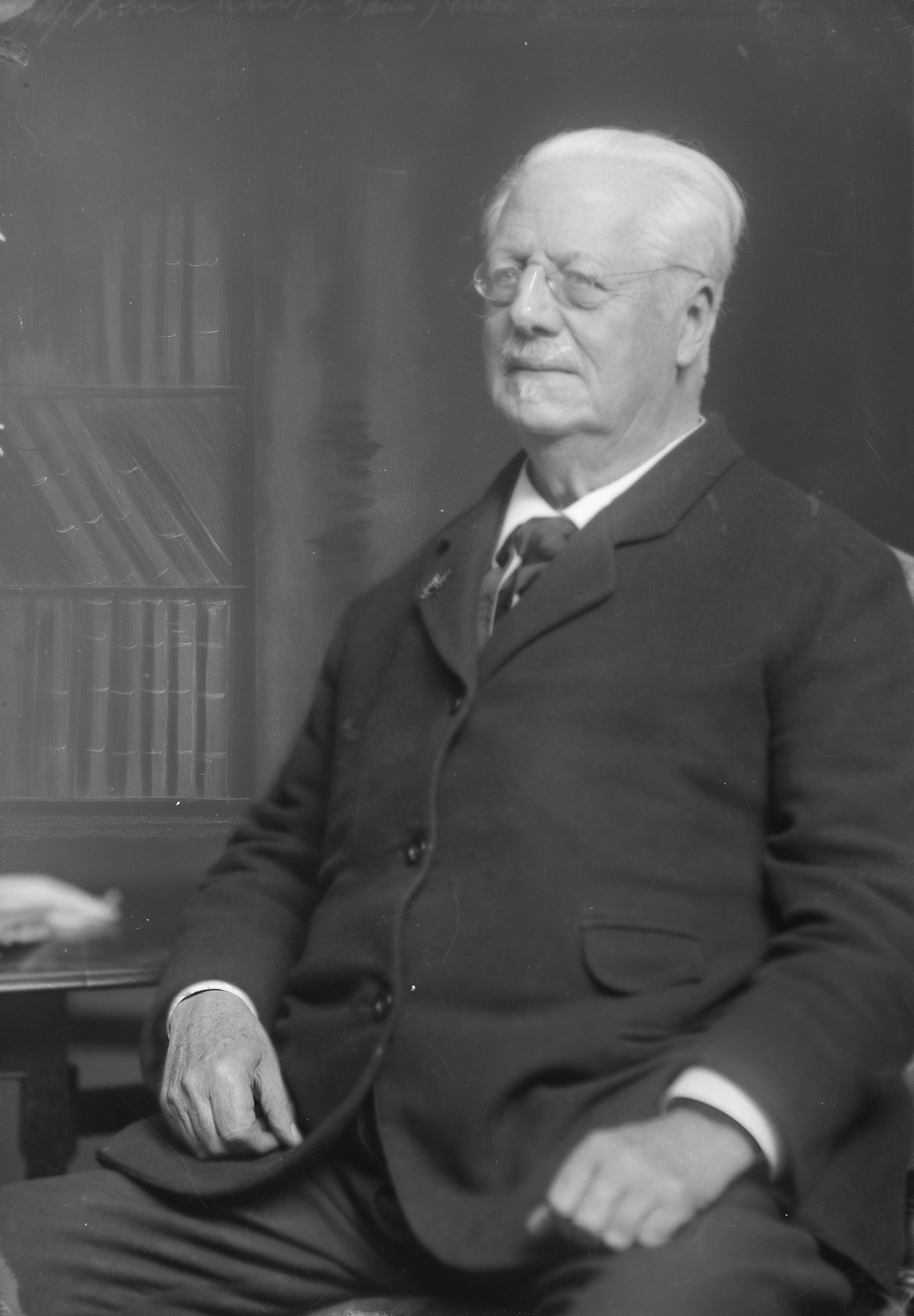
- Born: 28 October 1842; Amsterdam, Netherlands
- Died: 5 May 1927 (aged 84); Naarden, Netherlands
- Occupations: newspaper editor and owner
- Spouse: Emily MacDonnell

Charles Boissevain (28 October 1842 – 5 May 1927) was a journalist, editor and part-owner of the Amsterdam Algemeen Handelsblad, a leading newspaper of the time. From 1872 he was on the editorial board of the literary journal De Gids.

== Career ==
Boissevain's grandfather and father had developed Het Handelsblad as a business newspaper, and he continued in their footsteps. He wrote a daily article in the Handelsblad, "From Day to Day," which the Times called in its obituary a "feature of Dutch journalism".

During the Boer War, he supported the Boer cause in his writings. He published a series of articles on the war, collected as and republished in English translation as The Struggle of the Dutch Republics: A Great Crime. An appeal to the conscience of the British nation. It was subsequently published in German as well.

In 1881, Boissevain paid a visit to the United States and published his impressions in a series of articles in the Handelsblad, afterward republished in book form as From the North to the South.

== Family ==
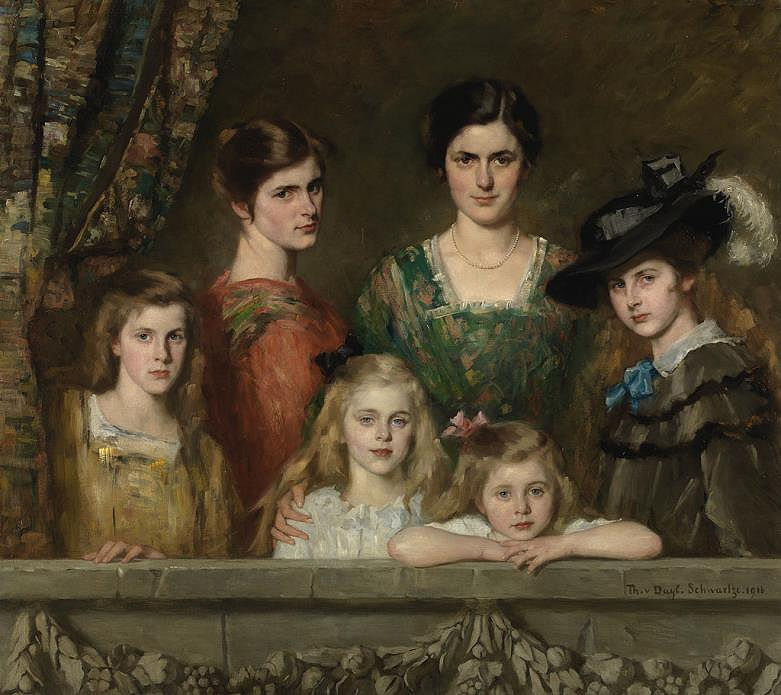
The six daughters of Charles E. H. Boissevain and his wife Maria Barbera Pijnappel, by Thérèse Schwartze (1916). They are Charles Boissevain's granddaughters.

Boissevain married Emily Héloïse MacDonnell (a granddaughter of Richard MacDonnell, Provost of Trinity College, Dublin) in England on June 27, 1867. They had eleven children: Charles Ernest Henri (1868-1940), Maria (1869-1959), Alfred Gideon (1870-1922), Robert Walrave (1872-1938), Hester (1873-1969), Olga Emily (1875-1949), Hilda Gerarda (1877-1975), Eugen Jan (1880-1949), Petronella Johanna (1881-1956), Jan Maurits (1883-1964), and Catharina Josephina (1885-1922).

Three of these children and a grandson migrated to North America. Eugen Jan became an importer of coffee from Java and married two notable 20th Century American women: suffragist Inez Milholland, for whom he moved to New York, and Pulitzer-prizewinning poet Edna St. Vincent Millay. Robert emigrated to Canada, as did Olga, who married Dutch sea captain and explorer Abraham Jacob van Stockum. Their son, mathematician Willem Jacob van Stockum, discovered solutions of Einstein's equations with closed timelike lines, and their daughter Hilda van Stockum was a well-known artist and author of children's books. In addition, Charles Ernest Henri's son Charles Hercules Boissevain (1893-1946), a doctor, moved to Colorado, where he became a tuberculosis researcher and co-authored the first comprehensive survey of native Colorado cacti.
