= Freedom Museum =

Museum in Groesbeek, Netherlands

Coordinates: 51.7855°N 5.9365°E

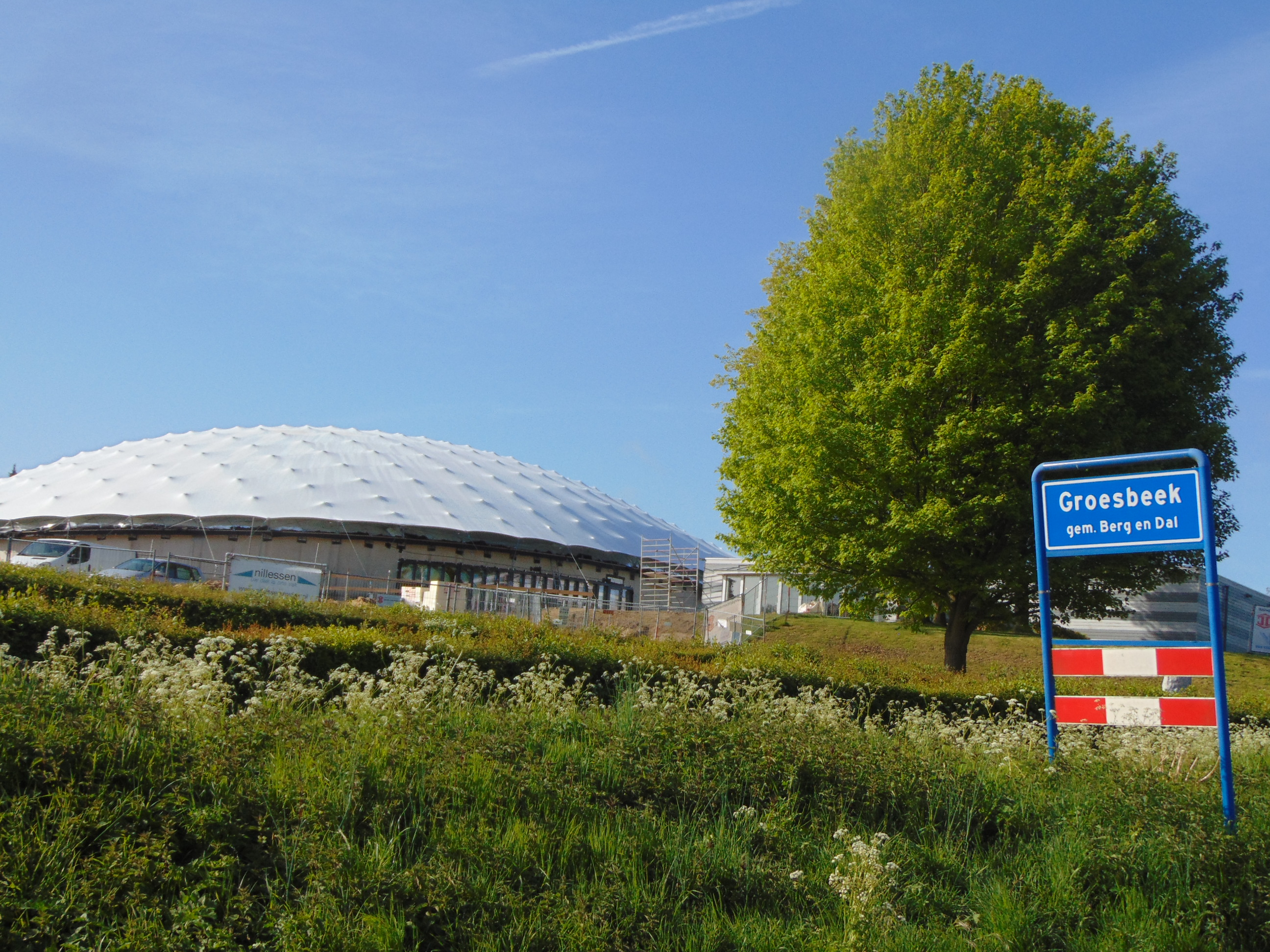
Freedom Museum, Groesbeek

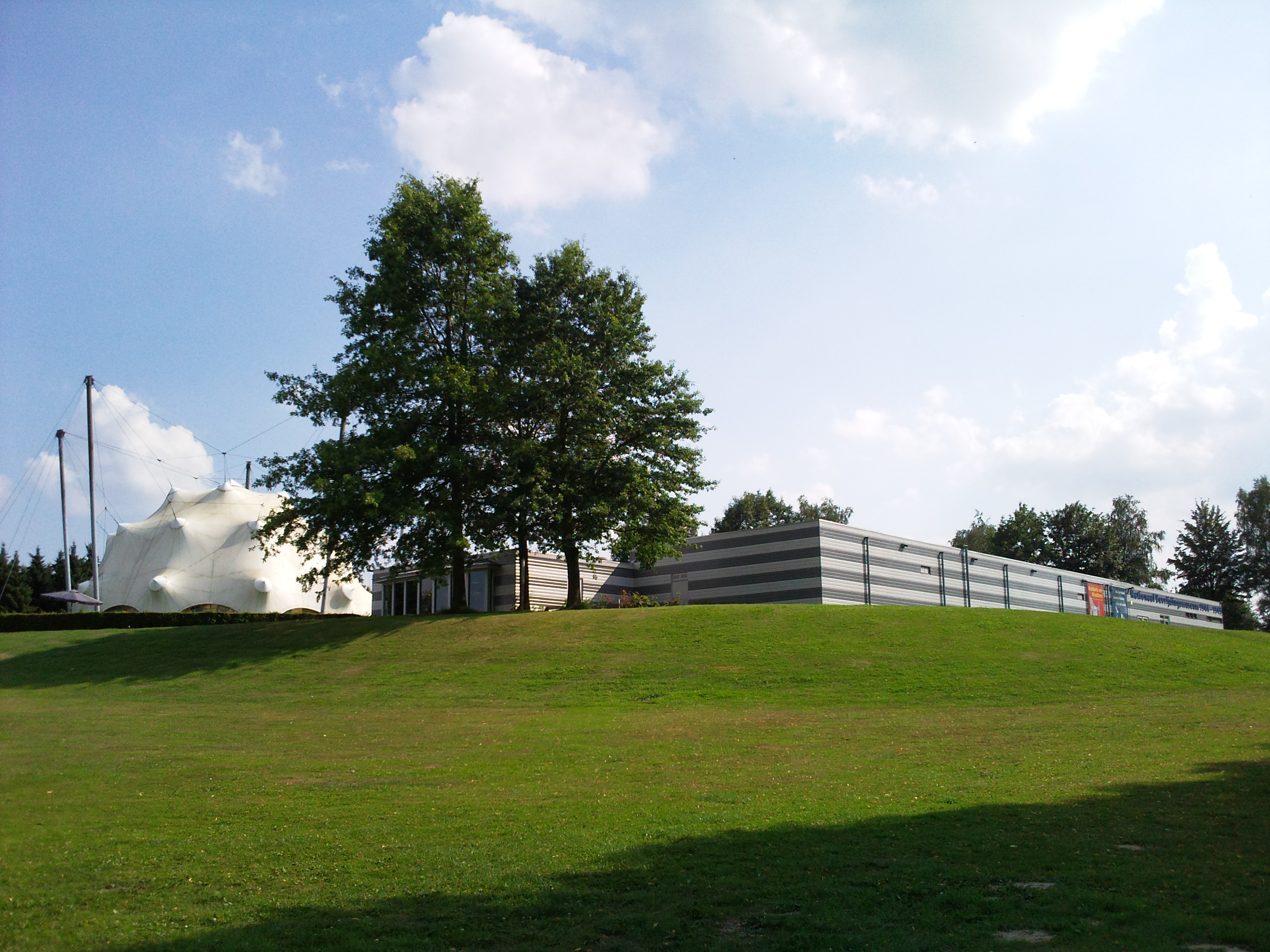
the old National Liberation Museum, Groesbeek

The Freedom Museum (Dutch: Vrijheidsmuseum) is a Dutch museum themed around the liberation of the Netherlands at the end of World War II, and is located in Groesbeek, close to the German border. Until September 2019 the museum was known as the National Liberation Museum 1944-1945.

The museum's structural shape resembles an inflated parachute, in remembrance of the events around Groesbeek during the end of World War II, like the 1945 Rhineland Offensive (consisting of Operation Veritable, Operation Grenade, Operation Blockbuster, Operation Plunder and Operation Varsity) and the September 1944 airdropping of thousands of allied paratroopers on the fields around Groesbeek during Operation Market Garden. The museum further aims to provide a grander-scale image of the Dutch liberation of German occupancy in general.
