= Alice Tepper Marlin =

Alice R. Tepper Marlin (born 1944) serves as President Emerita, Founder, and a member of the board of Social Accountability International (SAI), a standard-setting organization for improving workplaces and communities. She served as president and CEO from 1997 to 2015.

== Early life ==
Alice R. Tepper Marlin earned her bachelor's degree in economics in 1966 from Wellesley College, and studied at the NYU Graduate School of Business Administration.

== Career ==
At the NYU Graduate School of Business Administration Tepper Marlin developed and taught its first Business & Society MBA course.

Early in her career Tepper Marlin served as a Securities Analyst and Labor Economist at Burnham and Company and as the editor of an international tax journal at the International Bureau of Fiscal Documentation in the Netherlands. She designed and managed the first social investment portfolio management service, in 1968.

In 1969, Tepper Marlin founded the Council on Economic Priorities (CEP), where she served as president and CEO for 33 years. CEP pioneered the socially responsible investing field, and regularly published the best-selling consumer guide, Shopping for a Better World (Ballantine Books).

Tepper Marlin has been a frequent public speaker on corporate accountability for five decades. She is also Citi Distinguished Fellow in Ethics and Leadership at NYU's Stern School of Business where she also serves as an adjunct professor in the Business and Society Program . Additionally, Alice served as a Faculty Member at Wellesley College’s Madeleine Albright Institute for Global Affairs. Tepper Marlin is a Member of the Council on Foreign Relations, an Ashoka Global Fellow and a Right Livelihood Laureate which was awarded for "showing the direction in which the Western economy must develop to promote the well-being of humanity."

== SAI ==
Social Accountability International (SAI) is headquartered in New York City. SAI provides capacity building services for its members and the SA8000 Standard, which was created by a multi-stakeholder advisory board regarding workplace conditions and human resource management. SA8000 is based on United Nations and ILO Conventions and Declarations, and on ISO management systems. SAI licenses organizations to verify compliance with the SA8000 Standard. It carries out public/private partnerships, supported by the US Dept. of Labor, the European Community, and other entities. Its Ten Squared and Social Fingerprint tools are intended for supply chain management and for addressing work conditions and business KPIs at factories and farms.

== Publications ==
- Lydenberg, Steven D; Marlin, Alice Tepper; Strub, Sean O'Brien; Council on Economic Priorities (1986), Rating America's corporate conscience : a provocative guide to the companies behind the products you buy every day, Addison-Wesley, ISBN 978-0-201-15879-3
- Marlin, Alice Tepper (1992), Shopping for a better world : a quick and easy guide to socially responsible supermarket shopping, Ballantine Books, ISBN 978-0-345-37083-9
- Resnikoff, Marvin; Audin, Lindsay; Bernstein, Nancy; Marlin, Alice Tepper (1983), The next nuclear gamble : transportation and storage of nuclear waste, CEP studies, S 83-1, Council on Economic Priorities, ISBN 978-0-87871-020-1
- Marlin, Alice Tepper; Social Accountability International; Global Academy for Social Entrepreneurship (2006). Setting the standard for the global economy (DVD). Social entrepreneurship series. Ashoka Innovators for the Public. OCLC 71326366.

== Honors and awards ==
- 2010 Top 100 Thought Leaders in Trustworthy Business Behavior,
- Founding Member, The Global Academy for Social Entrepreneurship, Ashoka, 2005
- Board Member, ISEAL Alliance, 2000 to 2011
- Right Livelihood Honorary Award, 1990.
- Woman of Year Award, Adweek, 1990.
- Honorary Doctor of Laws Degree, Pine Manor College, 1990
- Woodrow Wilson Senior Fellow, 1974–77

== Feature articles ==
Profiled in: People, New York Times, Vogue, Time, Miami Herald, Newsday, Los Angeles Times, Palm Beach Post, The Philadelphia Inquirer, Asahi Simbun and numerous European publications.

== Media ==
Alice Tepper Marlin has been featured on NBC-TV's The Today Show, ABC-TV's Good Morning America, CBS-TV's Morning News, CNN and many other television shows, plus over 1,000 radio programs.

== Personal life ==
On 26 September 1971, Alice R. Tepper married John Anthony Marlin, who legally added his wife's maiden name as a middle name.
