= Mesa Verde (Costa Mesa) =

- Neighborhood
- Location within the Los Angeles metropolitan area Location within California
- Coordinates: 33°40′21″N 117°56′08″W
- Country: United States
- State: California
- County: Orange
- City: Costa Mesa

Area
  - Total: 3.5 sq mi (9.1 km^{2})
  - Land: 3.4 sq mi (8.8 km^{2})
  - Water: 0.1 sq mi (0.26 km^{2})

Population (2018)
  - Total: 50,541
- Time zone: UTC-8
  - Summer (DST): UTC-7
- ZIP: 92626
- Area codes: 714

Mesa Verde is a neighborhood in Costa Mesa, California. It is bounded by the Interstate 405 freeway to the north, Harbor Boulevard to the east, Victoria Street to the south, and the Santa Ana River to the west. The community is bisected by Adams Avenue and contains the Fairview Channel, a Santa Ana River tributary that connects to Fairview Park, a wetland and riparian natural area. The neighborhood is home to two golf course complexes–the Costa Mesa Golf Course and the Mesa Verde Country Club.

In 2018, the median household income in Mesa Verde was US$84,968.

== History ==
The area in which Mesa Verde is currently located was largely unconstructed until the 1960s and 1970s when an influx of developments hit the region.

The Mesa Verde Country Club opened in the northwest corner of the neighborhood in January of 1959 and has been home to numerous golfing events. The Orange County Opens and numerous PGA Tour events have been held at the course. The course was formerly home to the Toshiba Seniors Classic. Famous golfers such as Arnold Palmer, Tiger Woods, and Chi-Chi Rodríguez have golfed at the course.

== Demographics ==
Historical population
| Census | Pop. | Note | %± |
|---|---|---|---|
| 2000 | 48,200 | | — |
| 2010 | 49,341 | | 2.4% |
| 2018 (est.) | 50,541 | | 2.4% |

=== 2010 ===
The 2010 United States census reported that the population of the 92626 ZIP code was 49,341. The racial makeup of the area was 33,740 (68.4%) White, 964 (1.9%) African-American, 296 (0.6%) Native American, 6,433 (13.0%) Asian, 286 (0.6%) Hawaiian or Pacific Islander, 5,158 (10.5%) of other races, and 2,464 (5.0%) of two or more races.

=== 2000 ===
The 2000 United States census reported that the population of the 92626 ZIP code was 48,200. The racial makeup of the area was 34,672 (71.9%) White, 879 (1.8%) African-American, 273 (0.6%) Native American, 5,602 (11.6%) Asian, 386 (0.8%) Hawaiian or Pacific Islander, 4,311 (8.9%) of other races, and 2,077 (4.4%) of two or more races.

== Amenities and facilities ==
=== Parks ===
- Estancia Park
- Fairview Park
- Mesa Verde Park
- Smallwood Park
- Tanager Park
- Moon Park

==== Cemeteries ====
- Harbor Lawn-Mt. Olive Memorial Park & Mortuary

=== Schools ===
- Early College High School
- Estancia High School
- TeWinkle Middle School
- California Elementary School
- Christ Lutheran School
- Renascence School International
- Wardolf School
- Wilson Elementary School

=== Congregations ===
- Christ Lutheran Church
- The Church of Jesus Christ of Latter-day Saints
- Family Christian Church
- Kingdom Hall of Jehovah's Witnesses
- Livingstone Chapel
- Mesa Verde United Methodist Church
- Orange Coast Unitarian Universalist Church
- Palm Harvest Church

=== Governmental services ===
Fairview Developmental Center, a California Department of Developmental Services campus, is situated in Mesa Verde adjacent to the Costa Mesa Golf Course. The 114-acre complex is owned by the State of California.

Mesa Verde has two fire stations. Royal Palm Fire Station, a recently built facility, services the northern half of Mesa Verde. Placentia Fire Station 4, located on Placentia Avenue, provides firefighting and EMT services for the southern portion of the neighborhood. The Costa Mesa Corporation Yard, a city-owned storage lot for governmental vehicles, is located behind the Placentia fire station.

The United States Postal Service operates a post office on Adams Avenue.
