= Adolphe Boissevain =

Dutch banker who financed North American railways

Athanase Adolphe Henri Boissevain (8 March 1843 – 1 April 1921) was a Dutch banker who financed North American railways.

He was from a prominent Boissevain family that had long been active in the banking and insurance industries in Amsterdam.

He founded the banking company Adolphe Boissevain & Co in 1875. This firm was active in two fields: the introduction of American securities on the Amsterdam Stock Exchange and securities arbitrage between Amsterdam, New York and London. In 1888, in order to improve his position, he founded (in cooperation with his American partners, the Blake Brothers) the London-based company Blake, Boissevain & Co. Together the three companies were a strong alliance in the 3 main financial centers. The firm Boissevain & Co. was trading in 1913 (evidenced by March 6, 1913, purchase of shares in Marconi Wireless Telegraph Company of America held in the name of Boissevain & Co.). Adolphe‘s first assistant in the securities arbitrage business was J.L. Pierson who later became partner in the company. A few years after Adolphe retired the name of the firm was changed to Pierson & Co., predecessor of the present well-known investment bank MeesPierson.

One of Adolphe's primary businesses was in financing railway companies, particularly railway companies. He helped reorganize Union Pacific in 1893. He was also one of William Van Horne's main contacts in organizing financing for the Canadian Pacific Railway.

Along this line is situated, in Manitoba, the town of Boissevain, Manitoba, named after Adolphe and carrying the family coat of arms. In Virginia, too, there is a small town Boissevain also named after Adolphe because of his involvement in financing the Norfolk & Western Railways.

== Europe ==
Adolphe was also active in other European countries. In 1887 he was cofounder of one of the largest international banks in Switzerland the Schweizerischer Bankverein (now UBS). During 18 years he was a member of the board of directors. Later on his London firm Blake, Boissevain & Co was sold to this bank. Of course Adolphe traveled a lot. He often took the Friday night boat from Harwich to Hoek van Holland, stayed a week-end in his country estate Prins Hendriksoord in the Netherlands and on Sunday he took the night boat back to England.
