= Textile Research Centre =

Independent research institute working in the field of textiles and dress

- Established: 1991
- Location: Boerhaavelaan 6, Leiden
- Coordinates: 52°9′19.7″N 4°30′6.34″E
- Director: G.M. Vogelsang-Eastwood (2010)
- Website: www.trc-leiden.nl

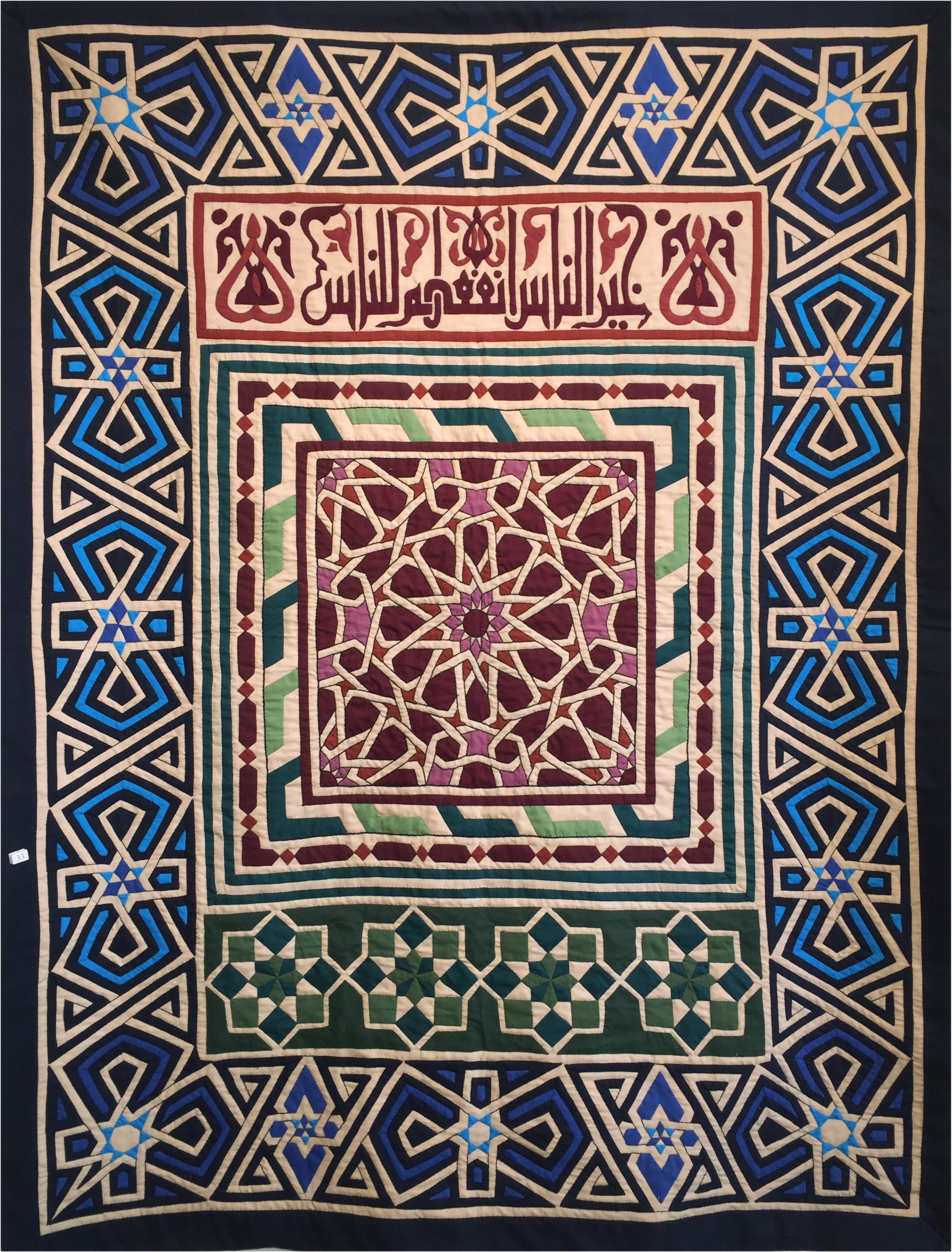
Egyptian appliqué

The Textile Research Centre (TRC), Leiden, Netherlands, is an independent research institute working in the field of textiles and dress. It is housed at Boerhaavelaan 6 in Leiden and includes exhibition space, storage rooms, a lecture room and other working areas. The current director of the TRC (as of 1991) is Gillian Vogelsang-Eastwood, a textile and dress historian.

== Aims ==
The TRC has the stated aim of teaching textile crafts and encouraging research into anthropological and archaeological textiles and clothing in the widest sense of the word. In particular, the TRC specialises in dress - what people wear in order to express their identity - and pre-industrial textile technology.

== History ==
The TRC was founded in 1991 as a Stichting (foundation; non-profit organisation). Since then it has been involved in many aspects of the academic study of textiles and dress, especially those from the Near East.

In 1997 the TRC started building up a textile and dress collection. By late-2022 the collection had grown to over 40,000 textiles, garments and accessories from all over the world. It also has a large collection of Dutch regional dress. Many of the garments were obtained during fieldwork by TRC staff and students, whilst others were purchased or given as donations.

Until August 2009 the TRC was housed in the National Museum of Ethnology, Leiden. After that the institute could be found on the Hogewoerd in Leiden for 16 years. The TRC is now located on the Boerhaavelaan 6 in Leiden. It organises a series of exhibitions, lectures, workshops and training courses for students and others who are interested.

Middle Eastern dress remains a focal point of the TRC. The veils in the TRC collection, for instance, were used for a major exhibition at the National Museum of Ethnology, Leiden (1996), and for various publications, including Covering the Moon: An Introduction to Middle Eastern Face Veils.

== Publications ==
- Encyclopedia of Embroidery from the Arab World (London: Bloomsbury 2016). ISBN 9780857853974
- Encyclopedia of Embroidery from Central Asia, the Iranian Plateau, and the Indian Subcontinent (London: Bloomsbury 2021). ISBN 9781350017245

== Exhibitions ==
- De Kleren van de farao: National Museum of Antiquities, Leiden (1994; travelled to Denmark and Germany). An exhibition about textiles and clothing in Ancient Egypt.
- Sluiers ontsluierd (For Modesty’s Sake?): National Museum of Ethnology, Leiden (1996–1997). An exhibition about the history and use of veils and face veiling in the Near East.
- Tutankhamun’s Wardrobe: Textile Museum of Borås, Sweden (1999). An exhibition with replicas of the garments found in the tomb of the ancient Egyptian pharaoh, Tutankhamun. This exhibition travelled to Britain, Denmark, Egypt, the Netherlands, Poland and the United States, and is now permanently based at the Textile Museum, Boras, Sweden.
- Hajj: National Museum of Ethnology, Leiden (2004–2005). An exhibition about the Hajj and the clothing (ihram) worn by Muslim pilgrims to Mecca.
- Flowing Robes: Clothing and Jewellery from Saudi Arabia: National Museum of Ethnology, Leiden (2006–2007).
- Dutch Lace Caps (Stadhuis Leiden, 2007–2008)
- The Indian sari (National Museum of Ethnology, Leiden, 2010)
- Embroidery from the Arab World (TRC Gallery, 2010)
- Well Dressed Afghanistan (TRC Gallery, 2010–2011)
