= Charles H. Boissevain =

Dutch-American tuberculosis researcher and botanist

Charles Hercules Boissevain (1893–1946) was a Dutch-American tuberculosis researcher and botanist in the United States.

== Biography ==
Charles Hercules Boissevain was born in Amsterdam, the Netherlands, on October 18, 1893, to Maria Barbera Pijnappel and Charles Ernest Henri Boissevain. His father was a businessman and politician who sat on the Amsterdam city council and was a member of parliament in the province of North Holland before and during World War I. His grandfather was Charles Boissevain, who had been the editor and part-owner of the Amsterdam Algemeen Handelsblad, a leading newspaper of its day. His mother was a Dutch advocate for women's rights who was a founder and president of the Dutch League for Women's Suffrage and (after the passage of suffrage in 1919) a member of parliament in the province of North Holland.

Boissevain received his degree as a doctor of medicine from the University of Amsterdam. After graduation he spent two years doing postgraduate work in Switzerland and a further two years at the Pasteur Institute in Brussels, Belgium. As a young man in Holland, Boissevain had been a champion sculler and an ice skater (elfstedentocht 1917), but these activities were curtailed when he contracted tuberculosis. At the advice of his doctors, he moved to the United States in 1923 and made his way to the Colorado mountains in search of relief. (See Tuberculosis treatment in Colorado Springs).

In 1924, Boissevain married Marie Therese Vera Zvetana (or Tsvetana), Countess of Hartenau (b. 1893). She was the daughter of Alexander of Battenberg and Johanna Loisinger. The marriage was dissolved in 1927 without issue.

In 1928, he married Ruth (Davis) Dangler (1892–1982), widow of the Chicago architect Henry C. Dangler (died 1917), who had been David Adler's partner. Her father was Dr. Nathan Smith Davis, Jr., dean of Northwestern University Medical College and son of Dr. Nathan Smith Davis, one of the founders of the American Medical Association. They lived in Colorado Springs until his death from cancer in October 1946. They had two children, a son, Menso, and a daughter, Maria.

== Research ==
Boissevain was a mathematically trained biochemist who worked as a professor of biology at Colorado College in Colorado Springs. In 1924, he was appointed the first chief of research and laboratory director of the newly founded Colorado Foundation for Research in Tuberculosis, later renamed the Webb-Waring Institute. He had a reputation as a brilliant researcher and a man of many ideas.

Boissevain had been interested in cacti for many years and eventually became a leading specialist in western cacti. He coauthored the first comprehensive survey of native Colorado cacti. It covers species in the genera Opuntia, Echinocereus, Sclerocactus, Coloradoa, Pediocactus, Coryphantha, and Neobesseya and includes numerous black-and-white photographs. One newly described species, Coloradoa mesa verdae, has since been reclassified as Sclerocactus mesae-verdae. Boissevain's coauthor, Carol Davidson, took all of the photographs except two, one of which was by Laura Gilpin and the other by Elzada Clover.

== Abbreviation ==
The standard author abbreviation Boissev. is used to indicate this person as the author when citing a botanical name.

- Standard IPNI Abbreviation: Boissev.

== Selected publications ==
=== Book ===
- Boissevain, Charles H., and Carol Davidson. Colorado Cacti: An Illustrated Guide Describing All of the Native Colorado Cacti. Pasadena, CA: Abbey Garden Press, 1940.

=== Articles ===
- Boissevain, Charles H. "Growth Inhibition of Tubercle Bacilli by Fusarium, Sp." Experimental Biology and Medicine 63, no. 3 (1946): 555–556.
- Boissevain, Charles H. "Growth Promotion of Bovine Tubercle Bacilli by Pyruvate." Experimental Biology and Medicine 54, no. 3 (1943): 344–345.
- Boissevain, Charles H. "Survival of Tubercle Bacilli in Solutions Containing Glycerol or its Oxidation Products." Experimental Biology and Medicine 54, no. 3 (1943): 342–344.
- Boissevain, Charles H. "The Action of Unsaturated Fatty Acids on Tubercle Bacilli." American Review of Tuberculosis 13 (1926): 84–89.
