= Echinomastus =

Formerly accepted genus of cacti

Echinomastus (meaning "spiny breast") was a formerly recognized genus of cacti. As of February 2024, it is accepted as a synonym of Sclerocactus. Species formerly placed in the genus are native to the southwestern United States and Mexico.

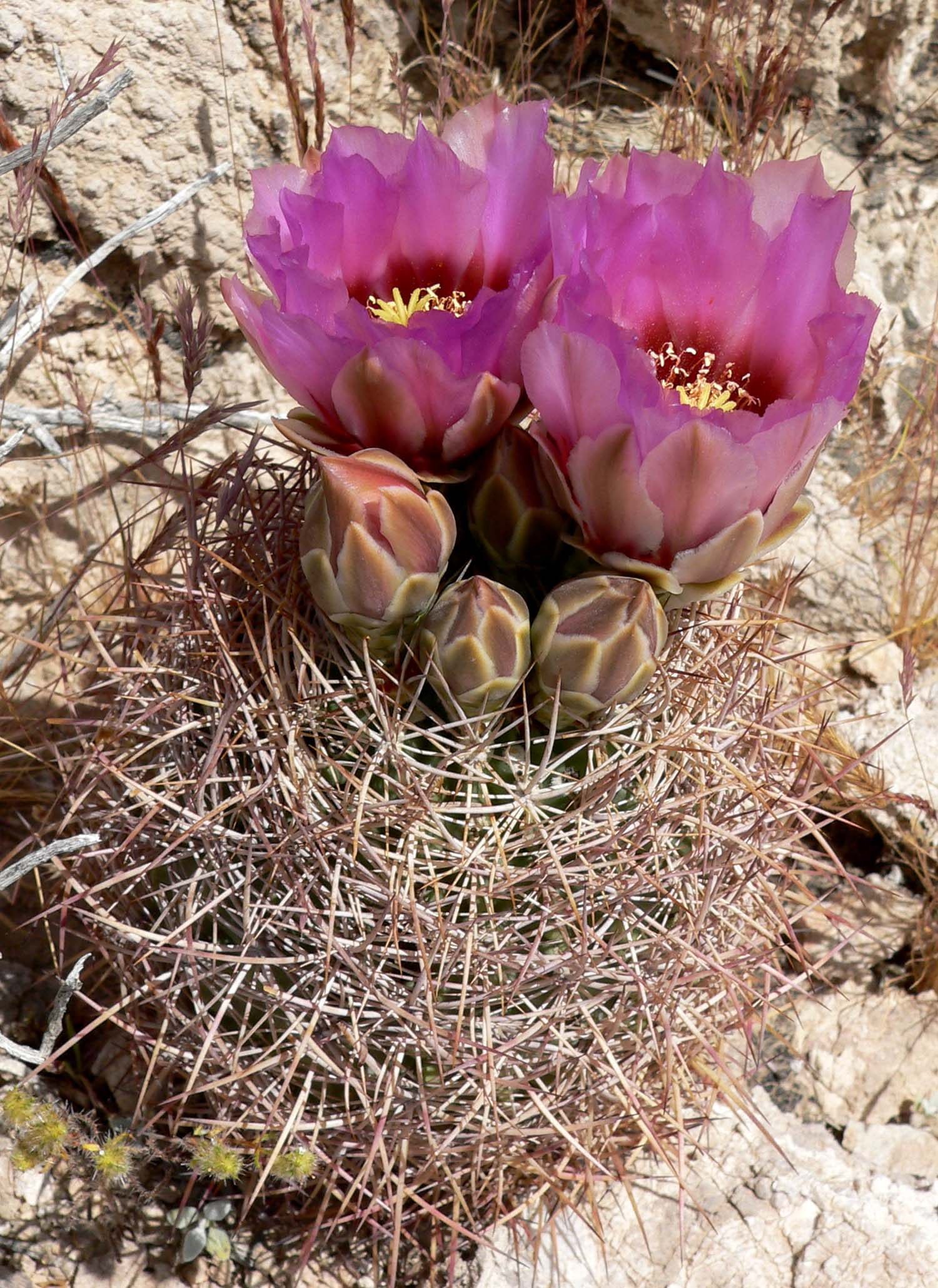
Sclerocactus johnsonii, formerly Echinomastus johnsonii

== Former species ==
Formerly accepted species include:

- Echinomastus erectocentrus (J.M.Coult.) Britton & Rose → Sclerocactus johnsonii subsp. erectocentrus (J.M.Coult.) M.A.Bake
- Echinomastus johnsonii (Parry ex Engelm.) E.M.Baxter → Sclerocactus johnsonii (Parry ex Engelm.) N.P.Taylor
- Echinomastus mariposensis Hester → Sclerocactus mariposensis (Hester) N.P.Taylor
