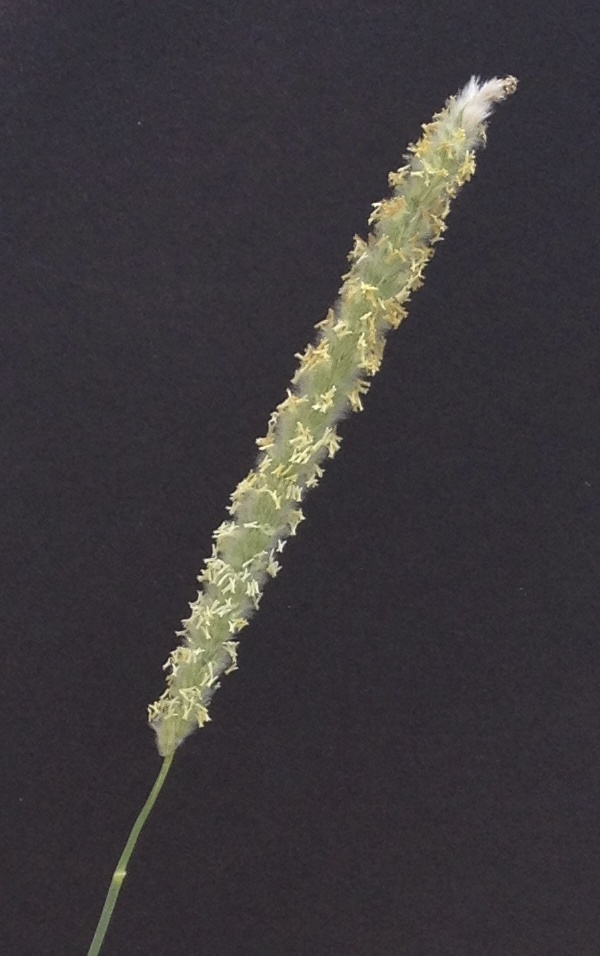
- Anthephora pubescens

Scientific classification
- Kingdom: Plantae
- Clade: Tracheophytes
- Clade: Angiosperms
- Clade: Monocots
- Clade: Commelinids
- Order: Poales
- Family: Poaceae
- Subfamily: Panicoideae
- Supertribe: Panicodae
- Tribe: Paniceae
- Subtribe: Anthephorinae
- Genus: Anthephora; Schreb.

Type species
- Anthephora elegans Schreb.

Synonyms
- Hypudaeurus Rchb.

= Anthephora =

Genus of grasses

Anthephora is a genus of plants in the grass family, native to southwest Asia, Africa, the Americas, and various islands.

Species

- Anthephora ampullacea - Guinea, Nigeria, Democratic Republic of the Congo, Angola
- Anthephora argentea - Namibia, Botswana, Cape Province
- Anthephora cristata - from Guinea to Angola
- Anthephora elongata - Democratic Republic of the Congo, Tanzania, Angola, Malawi, Zambia
- Anthephora hermaphrodita - Mexico, Central America, northern South America, West Indies, Galápagos; naturalized in Florida, Hawaii
- Anthephora laevis - Eritrea, Sudan, Israel, Palestine, Jordan
- Anthephora nigritana - Niger, Nigeria, Chad, Republic of the Congo, Eritrea, Somalia, Sudan, South Sudan, Kenya, Yemen, Saudi Arabia
- Anthephora pubescens - dry Africa from Algeria to Somalia to Cape Province; Iran
- Anthephora pungens - Malawi, Mozambique, Zambia
- Anthephora schinzii - Angola, Botswana, Cape Province, Namibia
- Anthephora truncata - Democratic Republic of the Congo, Tanzania, Zambia, Zimbabwe

formerly included

see Bouteloua Hilaria Tarigidia

- Anthephora aequiglumis - Tarigidia aequiglumis
- Anthephora axilliflora - Bouteloua dactyloides
- Anthephora belangeri - Hilaria belangeri
- Anthephora punctulata - Hilaria cenchroides

== See also ==
- List of Poaceae genera
