= SS Samara =

Liberty ship of World War II

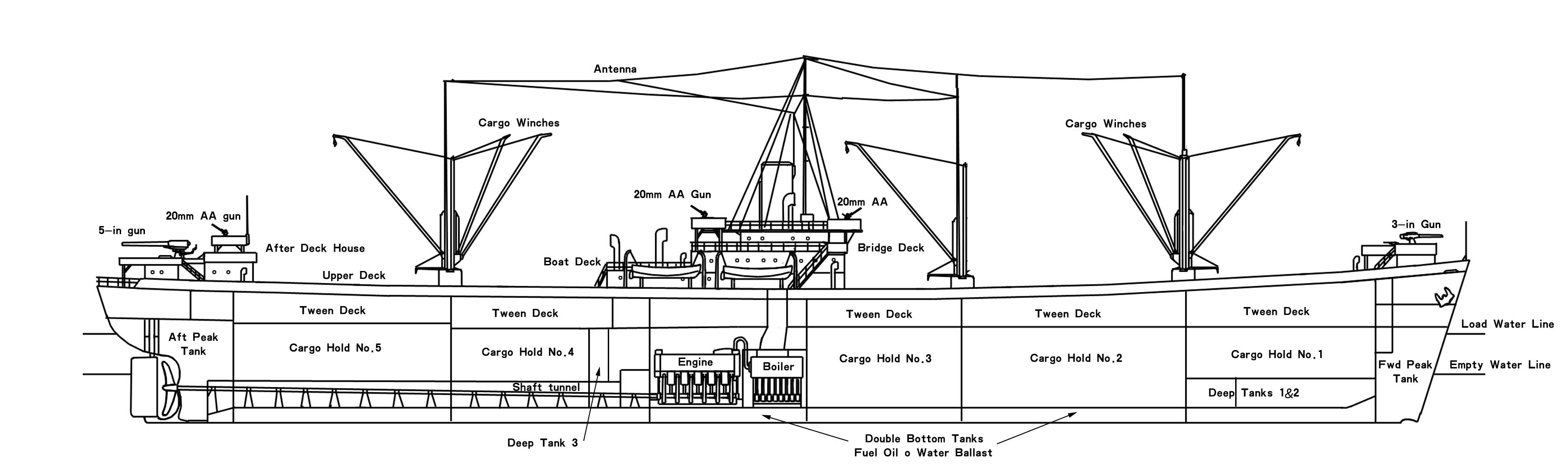
- Drawing of a liberty ship

History
- Name: Emma Lazarus (1943); Samara (1943); Samshire (1943-1947); City of Doncaster (1947-1961); Pembroke Trader (1961-1966); Galleta (1966-1970)
- Namesake: Emma Lazarus; Samara; City of Doncaster; Galleta
- Port of registry: London, United Kingdom (1943–61); Bermuda, United Kingdom (1961–66); Liberia (1966–70)
- Builder: Bethlehem Fairfield Shipyard
- Laid down: 28 July 1943
- Launched: 22 August 1943
- Completed: 30 August 1943
- Out of service: 10 April 1970
- Fate: Scrapped, July 1970

General characteristics
- Class & type: Liberty ship; type EC2-S-C1, standard
- Tonnage: 10,865 LT DWT; 7,176 GRT
- Displacement: 3,380 long tons (3,434 t) (light); 14,245 long tons (14,474 t) (max)
- Length: 441 feet 6 inches (135 m) oa; 416 feet (127 m) pp; 427 feet (130 m) lwl
- Beam: 57 feet (17 m)
- Draft: 27 ft 9.25 in (8.4646 m)
- Installed power: 2 × Oil fired 450 °F (232 °C) boilers, operating at 220 psi (1,500 kPa); 2,500 hp (1,900 kW)
- Propulsion: 1 × triple-expansion steam engine, (manufactured by General Machinery Corp., Hamilton, Ohio); 1 × screw propeller
- Speed: 11.5 knots (21.3 km/h; 13.2 mph)
- Capacity: 562,608 cubic feet (15,931 m^{3}) (grain); 499,573 cubic feet (14,146 m^{3}) (bale)
- Complement: 38–62 USMM; 21–40 USNAG
- Armament: Varied by ship; Bow-mounted 3-inch (76 mm)/50-caliber gun; Stern-mounted 4-inch (102 mm)/50-caliber gun; 2–8 × single 20-millimeter (0.79 in) Oerlikon anti-aircraft (AA) cannons and/or, 2–8 × 37-millimeter (1.46 in) M1 AA guns

SS Samara was a British Liberty ship built in the United States during 1943 for service in World War II. The ship was bareboat chartered to the British Ministry of War Transport, with Ellerman and Papayanni as managers. When her keel was laid, she held the name of SS Emma Lazarus. Later that year, the ship was renamed SS Samshire while under the same management. In 1947, the ship was used by Ellerman Lines as SS City of Doncaster until 1961, when she was sold to Trader Line, Bermuda, as SS Pembroke Trader. Her final management was Doreen Steamship Corp. in Panama, as SS Galleta until she ran aground off Calcutta on 10 April 1970. She was finally scrapped in Hong Kong during July of the same year. Her namesake was Samara, a Russian city in Samara Oblast.

== Description ==
The ship was 442 ft 8 in (134.92 m) long overall (417 ft 9 in (127.33 m) between perpendiculars, 427 ft 0 in (130.15 m) waterline), with a beam of 57 ft 0 in (17.37 m). She had a depth of 34 ft 8 in (10.57 m) and a draught of 27 ft 9 in (8.46 m). She was assessed at 7,210 GRT, 4,880 NRT, 10,856 DWT.

She was powered by a triple expansion steam engine, which had cylinders of 24.5 inches (62 cm), 37 inches (94 cm) and 70 inches (180 cm) diameter by 70 inches (180 cm) stroke. The engine was built by the Worthington Pump & Machinery Corporation, Harrison, New Jersey. It drove a single screw propeller, which could propel the ship at 11 knots (20 km/h).

== Construction and career ==
This ship was built by Bethlehem Fairfield Shipyard in Baltimore. She was laid down on 28 July 1943 and launched on 22 August 1943, later completed on 30 August 1943. She was laid down as Emma Lazarus.

The ship was managed by Ellerman & Bucknall Steamship Company in 1943. She departed Hampton Roads together with Convoy UGS 19 on 25 September for Port Said while carrying army stores, she arrived on 23 October. The ship returned to Clyde with Convoy MKF 25 on 27 October, from Algiers. Later that year, she was renamed Samshire while under the same management.

In 1947, she was renamed City of Doncaster by Ellerman & Bucknall. Her management was transferred to City Line Ltd., Glasgow, from 1951 until she was again sold to Trader Line Ltd., ten years later. Under the name Pembroke Trader, with a flag of Bermuda. In 1966, Doreen Steamship Corp., Panama, manage to get acquire the ship and renamed it Galleta. Galleta was last managed by Fuji Marden & Co., Hong Kong before she ran aground 100nm southeast of Calcutta, caused by strong winds on 10 April 1970.

She was scrapped in July 1970 after being refloated and towed to Hong Kong.
