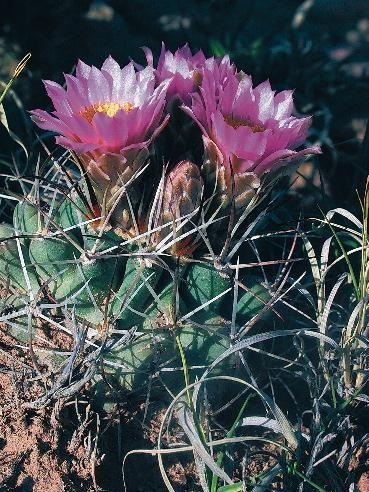

Conservation status
- Imperiled (NatureServe)
- CITES Appendix I

Scientific classification
- Kingdom: Plantae
- Clade: Tracheophytes
- Clade: Angiosperms
- Clade: Eudicots
- Order: Caryophyllales
- Family: Cactaceae
- Subfamily: Cactoideae
- Genus: Sclerocactus
- Species: S. glaucus

Binomial name
- Sclerocactus glaucus (K.Schumann) L.D.Benson

= Sclerocactus glaucus =

Species of cactus

Sclerocactus glaucus is a rare species of cactus known by the common name Colorado hookless cactus. It is endemic to Colorado in the United States, where it is known only from the area between Grand Junction and Montrose. It is a federally listed threatened species.

The description of this species formerly included plants now belonging to Sclerocactus brevispinus and Sclerocactus wetlandicus, two cacti endemic to Utah. When the second of the two species was separated in 1994, the name S. glaucus was applied only to plants found in Colorado; it made the common name Uinta Basin hookless cactus a misnomer, because now this species does not occur in the Uinta Basin of Utah. The two new species retained their federally threatened status, which they had received while members of S. glaucus. Sources vary in whether they recognize the separation of these species from S. glaucus; Anderson (2001) does not.

This cactus is cylindrical in shape and measures up to 28 centimeters tall by 9 wide, though it is usually much shorter. During the dry season it may shrink so much it disappears beneath the soil surface. There are up to 12 white radial spines on each of its areoles, and several straight whitish, reddish, or black central spines pointing in various directions. The central spines may be 1 to 2 centimeters long or more. The fragrant funnel- or bell-shaped flower is up to 5 or 6 centimeters long and has pink tepals. The stamens have white or green filaments and yellow anthers. The fruit is barrel-shaped and up to 2 or 3 centimeters in length.

This plant grows on exposed stretches of gravelly clay, including alluvial benches above floodplains and on mesa slopes. Nearby rivers include the Green, Colorado and Gunnison Rivers. It is part of saltbush and sagebrush-dominated desert shrub plant communities, or pinyon-juniper woodlands. Other plants in the habitat include shadscale (Atriplex confertifolia), galleta (Hilaria jamesii), black sagebrush (Artemisia nova), Indian rice grass (Stipa hymenoides), strawberry hedgehog cactus (Echinocereus triglochidiatus var. melanacanthus), Simpson's pincushion cactus (Pediocactus simpsonii), prickly pear cactus (Opuntia polyacantha), winterfat (Krascheninnikovia lanata), yucca (Yucca harrimaniae), snakeweed (Gutierrezia sarothrae), low rabbitbrush (Chrysothamnus viscidiflorus), sand dropseed (Sporobolus cryptandrus), and Salina wildrye (Leymus salinus).

This cactus faces a number of threats. Almost all of the populations are threatened by habitat loss and degradation due to human activities such as hydrocarbon exploration, residential development, rock mining, and the introduction of livestock to the area. It has been affected by the TransColorado Pipeline. The petroleum industry is expected to attract a large population to this rural area. Poaching is also a problem.
