= Moneilema semipunctatum =

Scientific classification
- Domain: Eukaryota
- Kingdom: Animalia
- Phylum: Arthropoda
- Class: Insecta
- Order: Coleoptera
- Suborder: Polyphaga
- Infraorder: Cucujiformia
- Family: Cerambycidae
- Genus: Moneilema
- Species: M. semipunctatum

Binomial name
- Moneilema semipunctatum LeConte, 1852

Synonyms
- Moneilema armigera; Moneilema forte; Moneilema obtusum; Moneilema scabra; Moneilema shantzi; Moneilema spoliatum

Species of beetle

Moneilema semipunctatum is a species of beetle in the family Cerambycidae. It was described by John Lawrence LeConte in 1852. It is known commonly as the cactus borer beetle. Beetles of genus Moneilema are known commonly as cactus longhorn beetles. It is native to North America, where it occurs in the western United States and Mexico.

This species is variable in morphology. It is wingless and black in color, and is usually convex and elongated in shape, shiny to dull, hairless, and textured with puncture-like marks. The female is 1.5 to 3 centimeters long and the male 1.5 to 2.6 centimeters.

This beetle lives in desert habitat, where it feeds on cactus plants, especially species of prickly pear (Opuntia) and cholla (Cylindropuntia). The beetle is a threat to several rare species of cactus, including the Mojave fishhook cactus (Sclerocactus polyancistrus), Wright's fishhook cactus (Sclerocactus wrightiae), Mesa Verde cactus (Sclerocactus mesae-verdae), Winkler's pincushion cactus (Pediocactus winkleri), and San Rafael cactus (Pediocactus despainii).

The adult beetle is nocturnal or crepuscular. It emerges and climbs cactus plants at dusk to feed during the night. It mates during the night and the female deposits eggs near the base of the cactus. The larva feeds on the plant, burrowing into it and causing damage.
