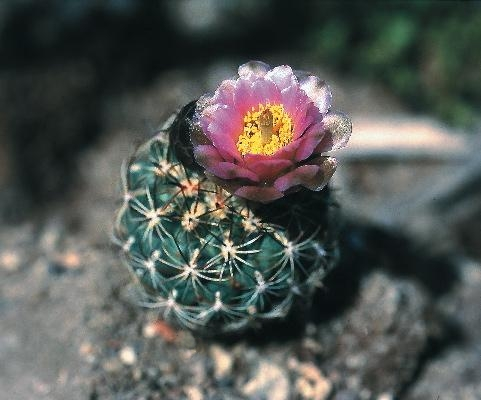

Conservation status
- Vulnerable (NatureServe)
- CITES Appendix I

Scientific classification
- Kingdom: Plantae
- Clade: Tracheophytes
- Clade: Angiosperms
- Clade: Eudicots
- Order: Caryophyllales
- Family: Cactaceae
- Subfamily: Cactoideae
- Genus: Sclerocactus
- Species: S. wetlandicus

Binomial name
- Sclerocactus wetlandicus Hochstätter

= Sclerocactus wetlandicus =

Species of cactus

Sclerocactus wetlandicus is a rare species of cactus known by the common name Uinta Basin hookless cactus. It is endemic to Utah in the United States, where it is known only from the Uinta Basin. It may also be called the Pariette cactus, but this name is more appropriate for Sclerocactus brevispinus, the species endemic to the Pariette Draw of Duchesne County.

Sclerocactus wetlandicus is threatened by a number of processes and human activities. This plant is federally listed as a threatened species of the United States. Until 1989 it was included under the description of Sclerocactus glaucus, a threatened cactus. When it was separated and elevated to species status it retained the threatened designation. Sources vary in whether they recognize the separation from S. glaucus; Anderson (2001) does not.

This cactus has a spherical or cylindrical shape, a green or bluish color, and a waxy texture. It grows up to 15 centimeters tall by 12 wide. There are several white, tan, or black radial spines and a few brown, black, or reddish central spines on each areole. The radial spines are up to 2 centimeters long, the central spines sometimes a bit longer. The fragrant funnel-shaped flowers are up to 5 centimeters long by 5 wide. They have pink tepals, the outer ones tinged brown.

This plant grows on mesa slopes with rough, rocky soils littered with cobbles and gravel. The desert shrub plant community includes such species as Atriplex confertifolia, Pleuraphis jamesii, Artemisia nova, and Achnatherum hymenoides. The cactus flowers are pollinated by insects, probably including bees, ants, and beetles.

This cactus grows throughout the Uinta Basin of Utah, mainly in Uintah County along the Green River and its tributaries. Despite its being limited to one region, it is found in many locations there and its population could number 30,000.

Threats to the species include damage to the habitat during hydrocarbon exploration, poaching, off-road vehicle use, and grazing. There are many active oil wells in the area, and there is associated activities in the habitat such as road construction and maintenance and pipeline installation and maintenance, which cause habitat fragmentation and the edge effect. Other damage includes erosion, dust production, and the introduction of weeds.
