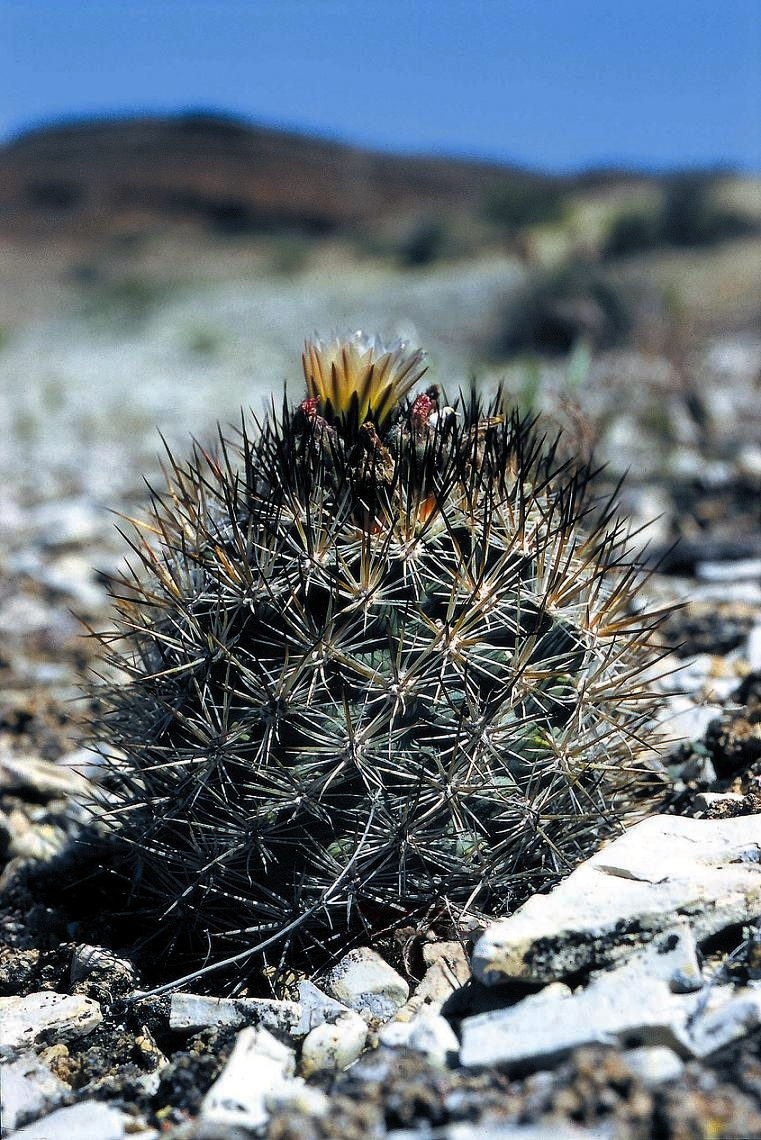

Conservation status
- Vulnerable (NatureServe)
- CITES Appendix I

Scientific classification
- Kingdom: Plantae
- Clade: Tracheophytes
- Clade: Angiosperms
- Clade: Eudicots
- Order: Caryophyllales
- Family: Cactaceae
- Subfamily: Cactoideae
- Genus: Pediocactus
- Species: P. sileri

Binomial name
- Pediocactus sileri (Engelm. ex J.M.Coult.) L.D.Benson

Synonyms
- Echinocactus sileri; Utahia sileri

= Pediocactus sileri =

Species of cactus

Pediocactus sileri is a rare species of cactus known by the common names Siler's pincushion cactus and gypsum cactus (or gypsum plains cactus). It is native to southwestern Utah and northwestern Arizona in the United States. It is limited to a specific type of soil, individuals are often spaced far apart, and the species is threatened by a number of human activities such as off-road vehicle use, poaching, and uranium mining. This is a federally listed threatened species of the United States.

== Description ==
This cactus is egg-shaped or sometimes cylindrical in shape, and may have short branches. It is up to 25 centimeters tall by about 11 cm wide. The surface is bumpy with areoles which are covered in hairs or woolly fibers. Each areole has 3 to 7 main spines which are black to gray or white in color, those occurring near the base of the cactus body reaching up to 3 centimeters long. Each areole also has many smaller white spines 1 or 2 centimeters long. Spines around the base of the cactus may help to anchor it to the soil. The cactus flowers in April and May. The flower is up to 2 centimeters long by 3 cm wide and has white-margined brown outer tepals and purple-veined yellow inner tepals. The fruit is yellow-green in color and just over a centimeter long.

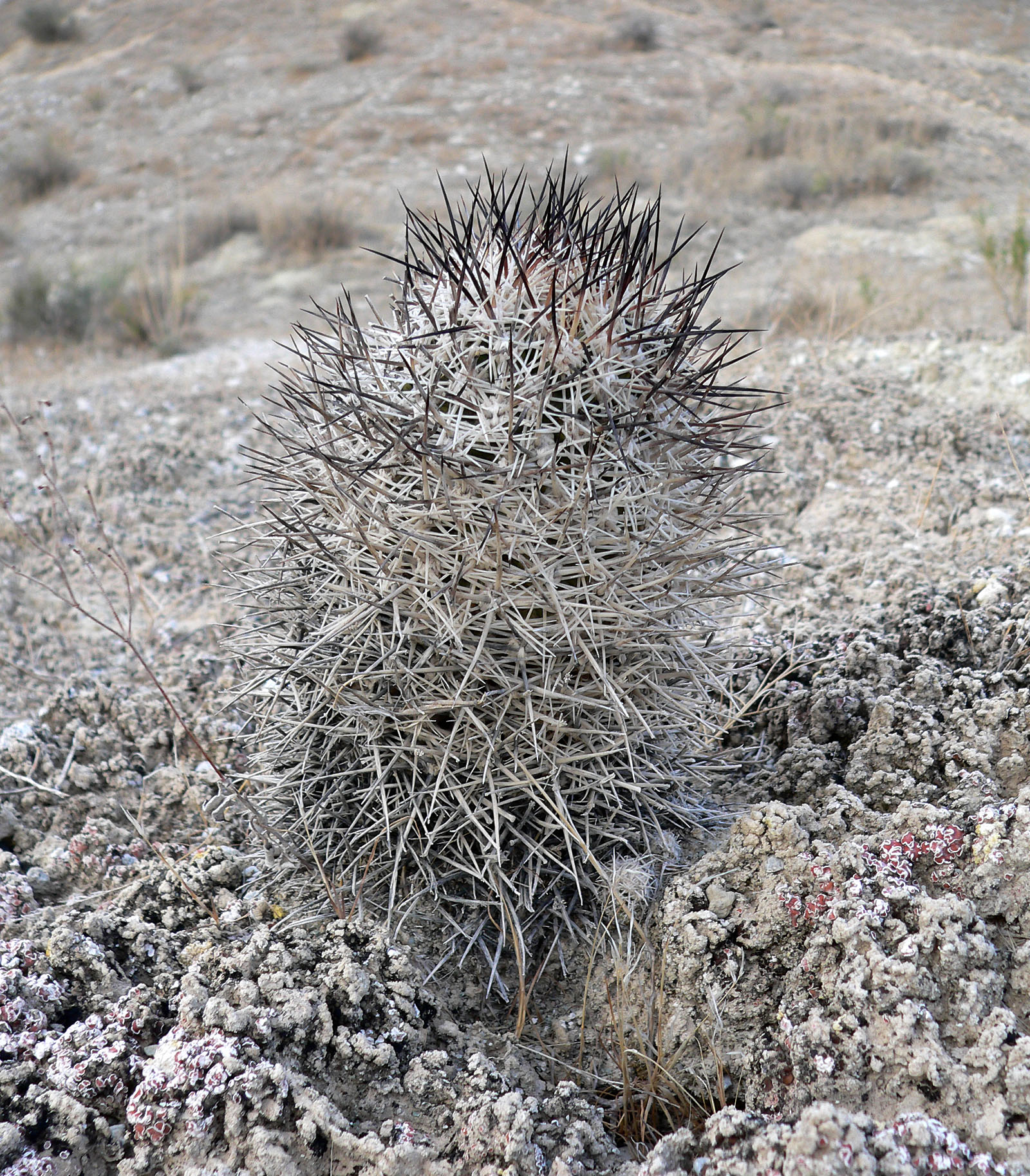
Plant

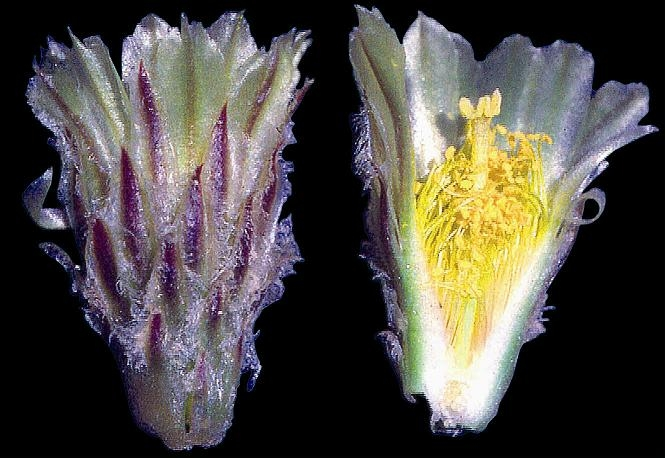
Cross section of flower

== Taxonomy ==
The names Pediocactus sileri and Sclerocactus sileri have a confused relationship in the literature. (Pediocactus at one time included Sclerocactus, although they are now thought not to be closely related.) According to the treatment in the Flora of North America, the taxon described here was first described as Echinocactus sileri in 1896 and transferred to Pediocactus sileri by L.D. Benson in 1961. Quite separately, L.D. Benson (in 1969) named a variety sileri of Sclerocactus pubispinus, which was raised to a full species under the name Sclerocactus sileri by K.D. Heil and J.M. Porter in 1994. The two taxa are treated as two separate species in the Flora of North America, which has entries for:

- Pediocactus sileri (Engelmann ex J.M. Coulter) L.D. Benson – Gypsum cactus, Siler's pincushion cactus
- Sclerocactus sileri (L.D. Benson) K.D. Heil & J M. Porter – Siler fishhook cactus

Mistakenly, Anderson (2001) describes only one species, under the name Sclerocactus sileri, treating Pediocactus sileri as a synonym. His description largely matches the description of Pediocactus sileri in the Flora of North America, and he uses the same common names (gypsum cactus, Siler's pincushion cactus) although the distribution he gives ("a very restricted area in Coconino County, Arizona") corresponds to that of Sclerocactus sileri in the Flora of North America ("restricted to northeast Coconino County, Arizona").

== Distribution and conservation ==
The cactus grows on sand and clay substrate that is part of the Moenkopi Formation, a geologic formation, especially the Schnabkaib Member of the formation. The soils are rich in gypsum and salts. Habitat in the area includes desert scrub, woodlands, and grasslands. Most of the land is under the stewardship of the Bureau of Land Management. The plant's distribution covers parts of Coconino and Mohave Counties in Arizona and Washington and Kane Counties in Utah. Though the current total population of the cactus is unknown and has not been estimated, there have been over 10,000 individuals documented over a territory measuring just over 34,000 acres (140 km^{2}).

Threats to this species include uranium exploration. As the price of uranium has increased recently, mining claims have also increased in number. All occurrences of the cactus occur on land that has potential for uranium discovery. Plans for uranium mining have often been modified to avoid damage to the cactus, but the threat still exists. Petroleum exploration and gypsum mining are considered future threats in the area, but not current ones. Off-road vehicles are popular in the local landscape, and there are designated roads for such activity and areas that are closed to vehicles for the protection of the plant. Grazing of livestock is considered a threat, but a minor one. Natural threats include drought and predation by rodents and rabbits.

Conservation activities include the establishment of the White Dome Nature Preserve in Utah, which protects land that is home to the cactus, as well as to the rare dwarf bear claw poppy (Arctomecon humilis) and animals such as the zebra-tailed lizard (Callisaurus draconoides) and the loggerhead shrike (Lanius ludovicianus).

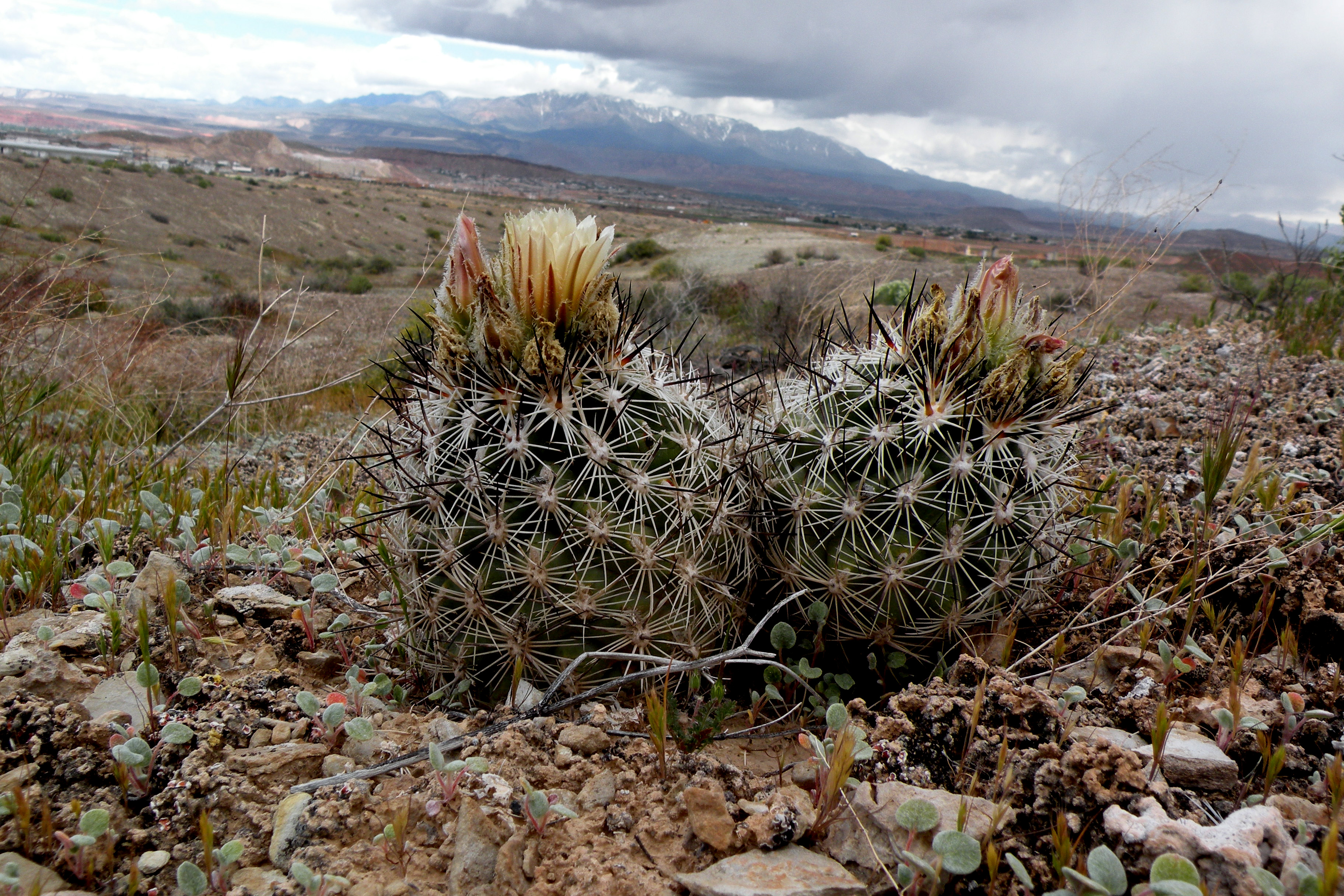
Plant growing in habitat in Utah

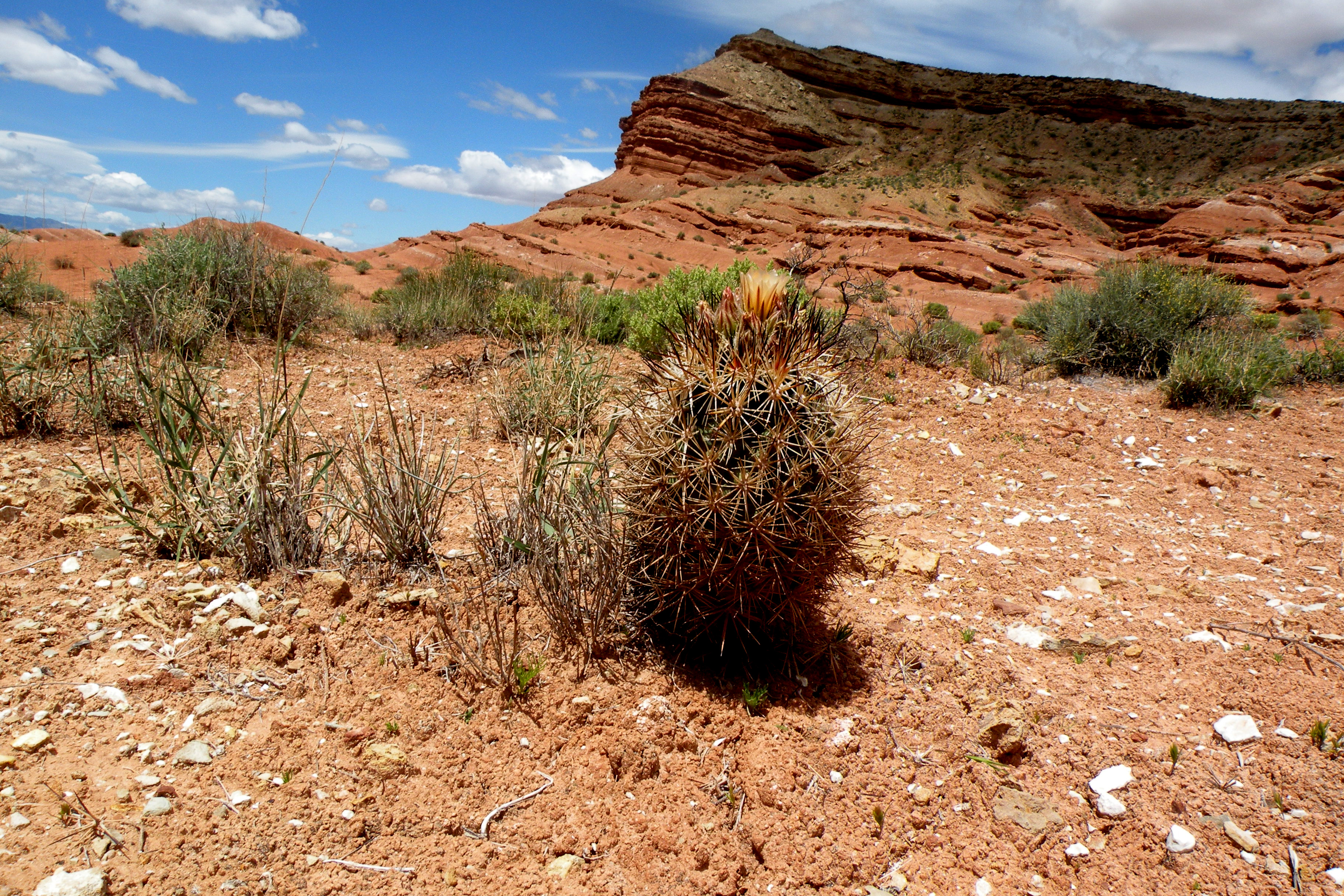
Plant growing in habitat in Washington County, Utah

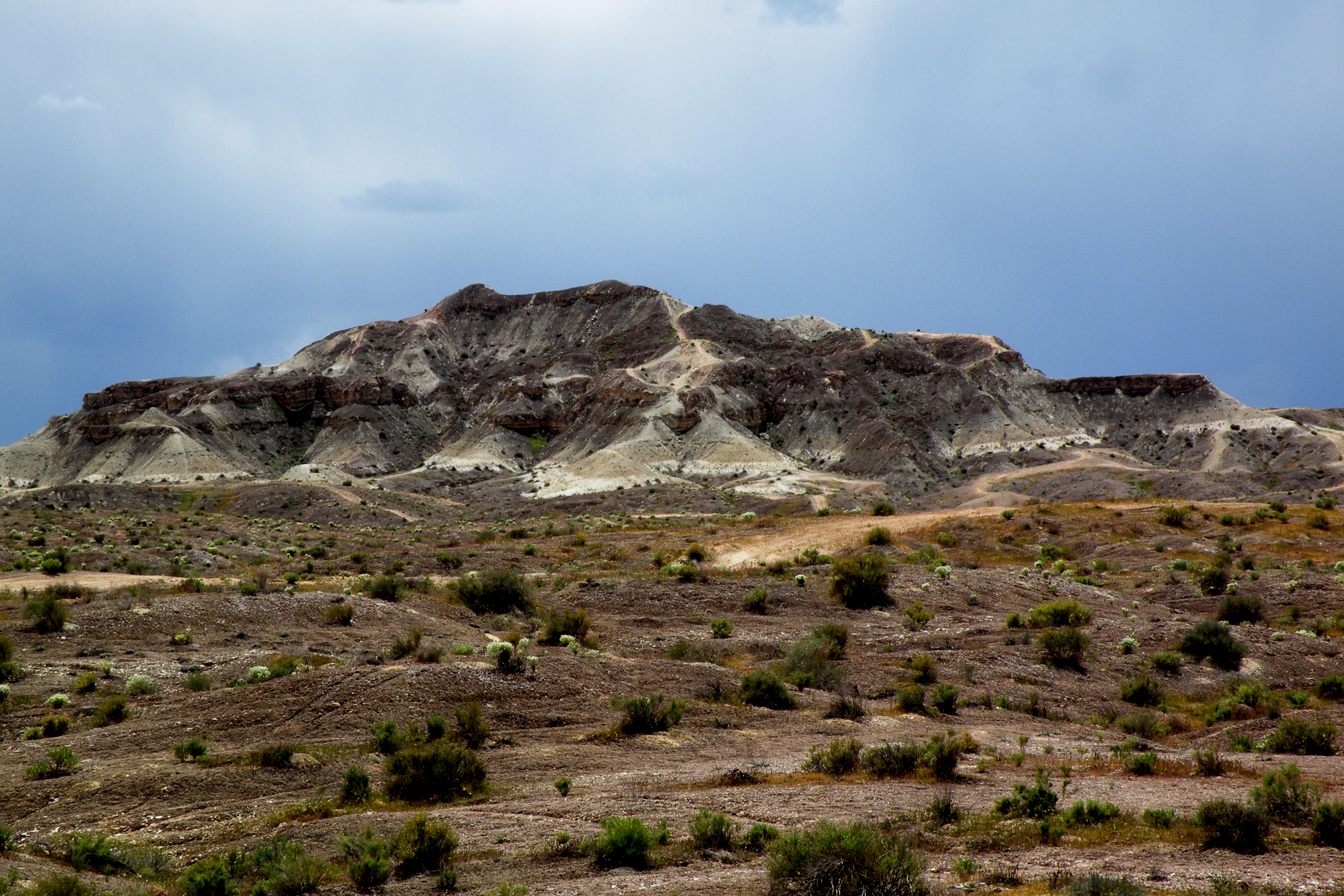
Habitat of Pediocactus sileri in Washington County, Utah
