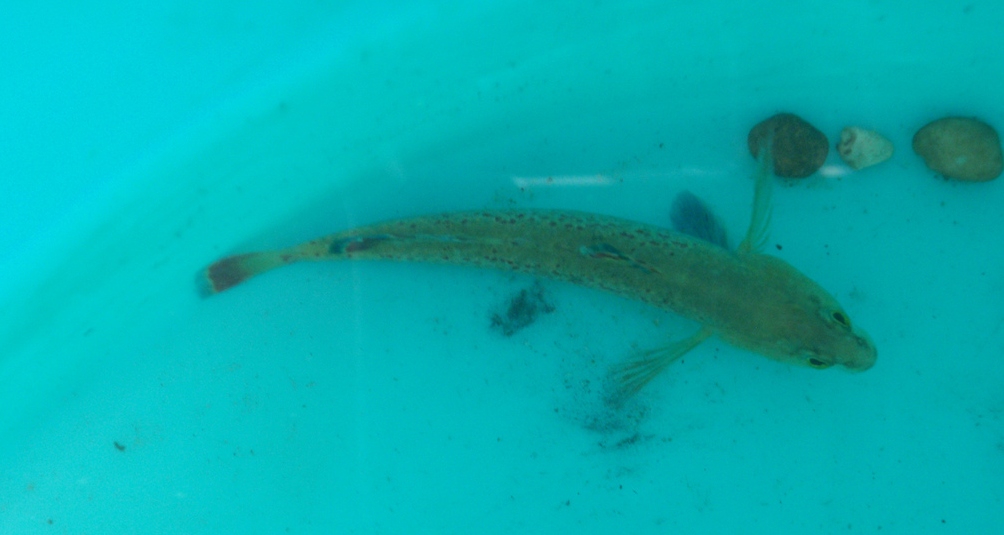

Conservation status
- Least Concern (IUCN 3.1)

Scientific classification
- Kingdom: Animalia
- Phylum: Chordata
- Class: Actinopterygii
- Order: Perciformes
- Family: Percidae
- Genus: Etheostoma
- Species: E. whipplei

Binomial name
- Etheostoma whipplei Girard, 1859

Synonyms
- Boleichthys whipplii Girard, 1859

= Redfin darter =

Species of fish

The redfin darter (Etheostoma whipplei) is a species of freshwater ray-finned fish, a darter from the subfamily Etheostomatinae, part of the family Percidae, which also contains the perches, ruffes and pikeperches. It is native to the south-central United States, where it occurs in Missouri, Arkansas, Kansas, and eastern Oklahoma.

== Description ==
The redfin darter can reach a length of 9.0 cm (3.5 in), though most only reach about 5.5 cm (2.2 in). Females and juveniles are grayish and mottled with 8–10 vague saddles on their backs. The snout is slightly pointed and the lips are dark. There are prominent bars that are suborbital and extend above, behind, and in front of the eye creating a cross through the eye. The bar in front of the eye nearly joins with the bar on the opposite side of the upper lip, making it appear in a spear-like pattern if viewed from above. Etheostoma whipplei has an incomplete lateral line, and the cheeks and breast area appear naked. Males in breeding colors have bright red spots that occur on the sides, the spots may not be as vivid and distinct in some specimens located in central Louisiana. They also have red spots on the spinous dorsal basal interradial membranes, and then a broad golden area followed by a bright red submarginal band with a deep blue band on the fin margin. The anal fin has a red base with the same vivid, deep blue as the dorsal in its margins.

== Habitat ==
The redfin darter's principal habitat is gravely or rubble riffles in small rivers, but in Louisiana and Mississippi it is associated with aquatic vegetation.

== Reproduction and life cycle ==
Redfin darters have a spawning period of 2.7 to 3 months from February to May. Females can produce clutches of 31–207 eggs. Males reach spawning conditions earlier than females in the species, and males are larger than females. Mature eggs average 0.89–1.18 mm in diameter and ripe eggs average 1.17–1.27 mm. Breeding males have vivid red and blue colors on the fins and body, like the Gulf darter (Etheostoma swaini).

== Etymology ==
Etheostoma whipplei is named after Amiel Weeks Whipple, a United States Army officer on whose expeditions many plant and animal taxa were first described.
