= Tarigidia =

Scientific classification
- Kingdom: Plantae
- Clade: Tracheophytes
- Clade: Angiosperms
- Clade: Monocots
- Clade: Commelinids
- Order: Poales
- Family: Poaceae
- Subfamily: Panicoideae
- Supertribe: Panicodae
- Tribe: Paniceae
- Subtribe: Anthephorinae
- Genus: Tarigidia; Stent

Type species
- Tarigidia aequiglumis (Gooss.) Stent

Genus of grasses

Tarigidia is a genus of South African and Puerto Rican plants in the grass family.

Some authors have suggested that the genus might be of hybrid origin: Anthephora × Digitaria.

Species

- Tarigidia aequiglumis (Gooss.) Stent - Namibia, Free State, North West Province
- Tarigidia axelrodii A.S.Vega & Rúgolo - Puerto Rico
