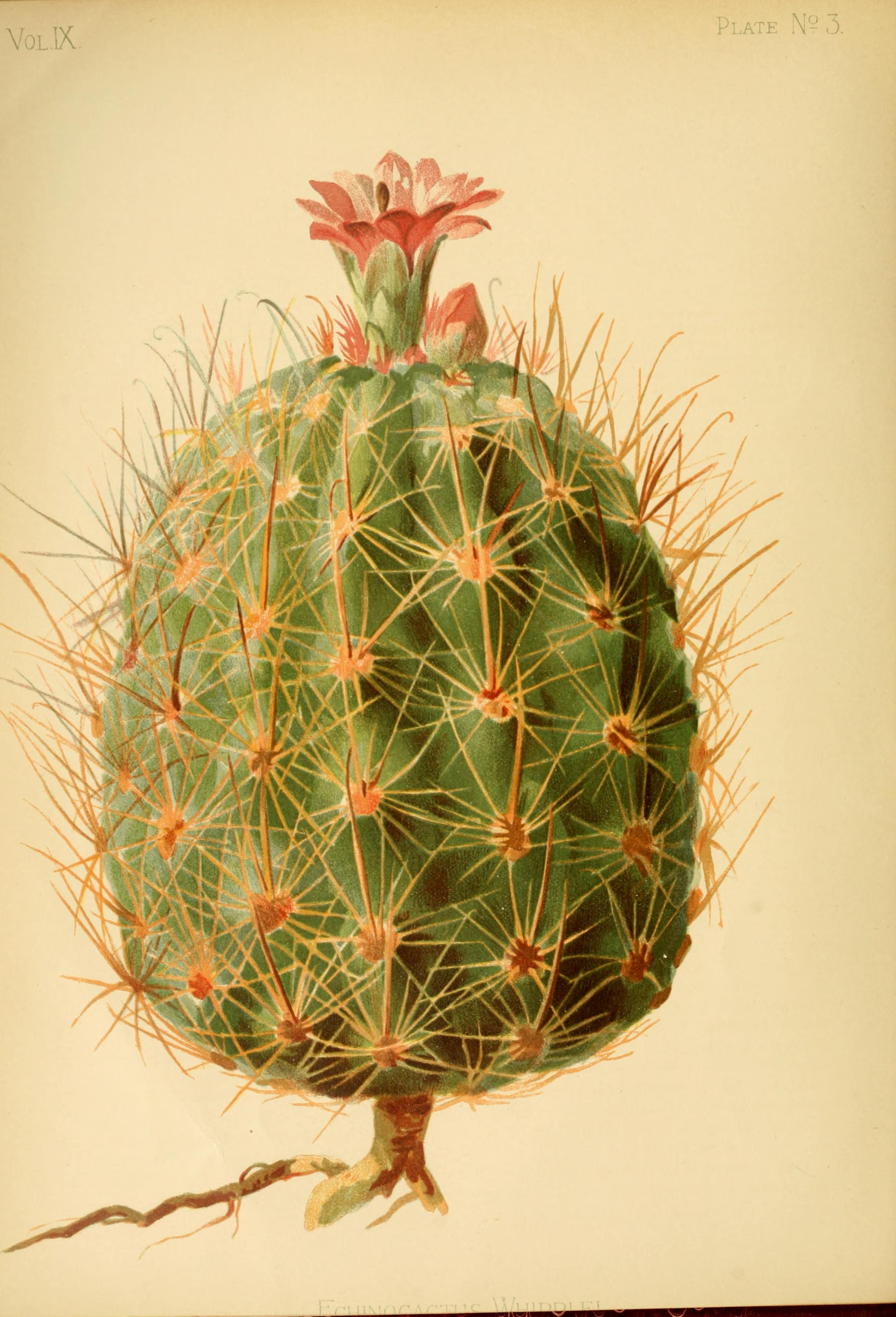

Scientific classification
- Kingdom: Plantae
- Clade: Tracheophytes
- Clade: Angiosperms
- Clade: Eudicots
- Order: Caryophyllales
- Family: Cactaceae
- Subfamily: Cactoideae
- Genus: Sclerocactus
- Species: S. whipplei

Binomial name
- Sclerocactus whipplei (Engelm. & J.M.Bigelow) Britton & Rose

= Sclerocactus whipplei =

Species of cactus

Sclerocactus whipplei, or Whipple's fishhook cactus, is a cactus (family Cactaceae) found in the Colorado Plateau and Canyonlands region of the southwestern United States.

The cactus was named in honor of Lieut. Amiel Weeks Whipple (1818-1863) the military engineer/surveyor, who led boundary survey team that identified the cactus specimen.

It typically grows in arid desert environments, often in sandy or rocky soils where drainage is good.
