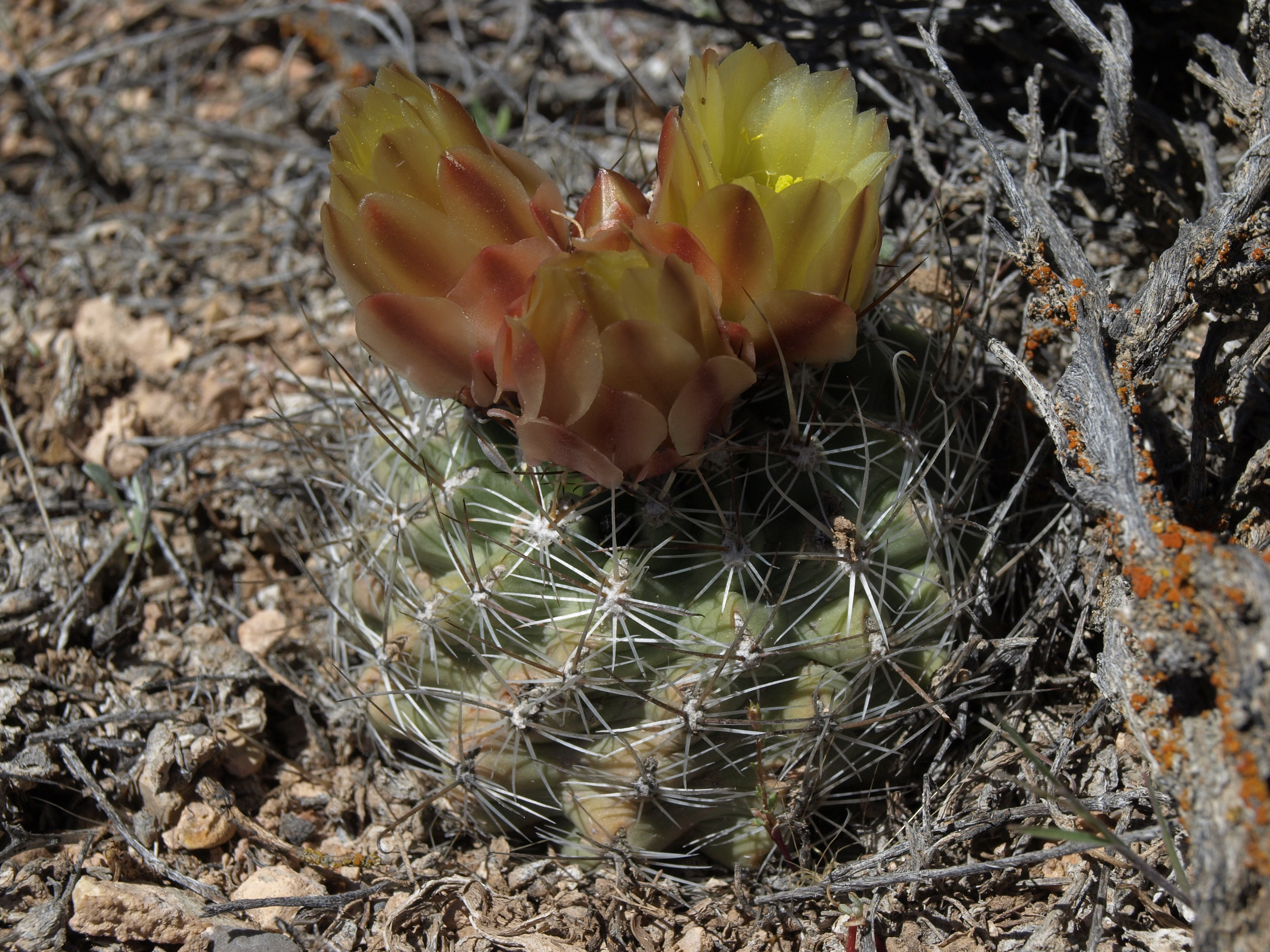

Conservation status
- Least Concern (IUCN 3.1)

Scientific classification
- Kingdom: Plantae
- Clade: Tracheophytes
- Clade: Angiosperms
- Clade: Eudicots
- Order: Caryophyllales
- Family: Cactaceae
- Subfamily: Cactoideae
- Genus: Sclerocactus
- Species: S. pubispinus

Binomial name
- Sclerocactus pubispinus (Engelm.) L. Benson

Synonyms
- Echinocactus pubispinus Engelm. 1863; Ferocactus pubispinus (Engelm.) N.P.Taylor 1979; Pediocactus pubispinus (Engelm.) Halda 1998

= Sclerocactus pubispinus =

Species of cactus

Sclerocactus pubispinus is a species of Sclerocactus found from Nevada to Utah.
