= Anthephora hermaphrodita =

Conservation status
- Least Concern (IUCN 3.1)

Scientific classification
- Kingdom: Plantae
- Clade: Tracheophytes
- Clade: Angiosperms
- Clade: Monocots
- Clade: Commelinids
- Order: Poales
- Family: Poaceae
- Subfamily: Panicoideae
- Genus: Anthephora
- Species: A. hermaphrodita

Binomial name
- Anthephora hermaphrodita (L.) Kuntze

Synonyms
- Anthephora cuspidata Andersson; Anthephora elegans Schreb.; Anthephora elegans var. armata Döll; Anthephora elegans var. villosa (Spreng.) Döll; Anthephora villosa Spreng.; Cenchrus laevigatus Trin.; Cenchrus tripsacoides Cav.; Cenchrus villosus (Spreng.) Spreng.; Colladoa monostachya Pers.; Tripsacum hermaphroditum L.

Species of grass

Anthephora hermaphrodita is a species of grass. The species also goes by the common name oldfield grass.

In 2020, the IUCN listed the species as least concerned due to its lack of threats, good population, and distribution.

The species is native to Aruba, Belize, Brazil, Colombia, Costa Rica, Cuba, Dominican Republic, Ecuador, El Salvador, Guatemala, Haiti, Honduras, Jamaica, Mexico, Netherlands Antilles, Nicaragua, Panamá, Peru, Trinidad-Tobago, and Venezuela.

The species was also introduced to Alachua County, Florida.
