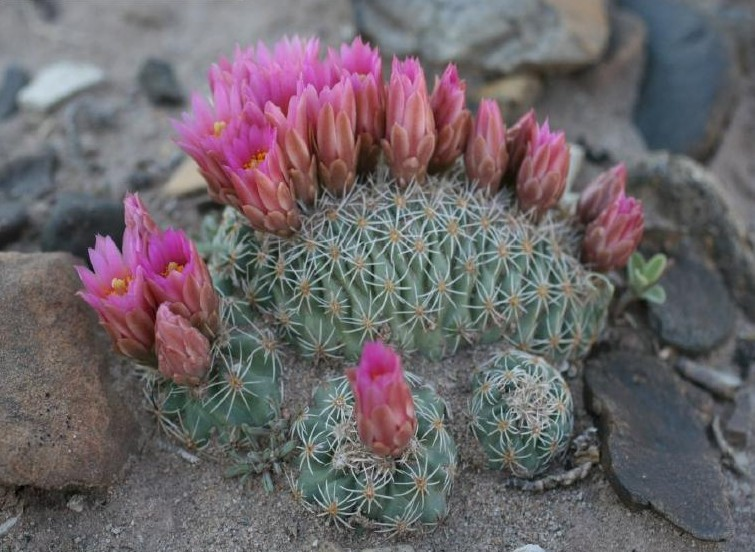

Conservation status
- Critically Imperiled (NatureServe)
- CITES Appendix I

Scientific classification
- Kingdom: Plantae
- Clade: Tracheophytes
- Clade: Angiosperms
- Clade: Eudicots
- Order: Caryophyllales
- Family: Cactaceae
- Subfamily: Cactoideae
- Genus: Sclerocactus
- Species: S. brevispinus

Binomial name
- Sclerocactus brevispinus K.D.Heil & J.M.Porter

= Sclerocactus brevispinus =

Species of cactus

Sclerocactus brevispinus is a rare species of cactus known by the common name Pariette cactus. It is endemic to Utah in the United States, where it is known only from the Pariette Draw, a draw in Duchesne County. It is threatened by a number of processes and human activities.

== Description ==
This cactus has a somewhat oval, flattened spherical, or short cylindrical shape, a green color, and a waxy texture. There are up to 13 radial spines on each of its areoles, and sometimes one to three central spines. The spines may be straight, angled, or hooked, and are straw or brownish in color with purple or red highlights. They are up to no more than about 0.3 to 0.4 centimeters in length. The bell-shaped flower is two to four centimeters long and has green or pink outer tepals and pink inner tepals. The stamens have white or pink filaments and yellow anthers. The fruit is green, tan, or pink-tinged and is 1.5 centimeters in maximum length.

== Distribution ==
This plant grows on the clay badlands of the Pariette Draw, where the soil is quite saline and alkaline. It grows on hills and flats in sagebrush. Other plants in the area include Sclerocactus wetlandicus, the other species that was separated from S. glaucus. Most of the population occurs on land owned by the Bureau of Land Management and the Ute tribe.

== Taxonomy ==
This plant is federally listed as a threatened species of the United States. Until 1994 it was included under the description of Sclerocactus glaucus, a threatened cactus. When it was separated and elevated to species status it retained the threatened designation. A proposal to uplist it to endangered status is pending. Sources vary in whether they recognize the separation from S. glaucus; Anderson (2001) does not.

Threats to the species include damage to the habitat during hydrocarbon exploration, poaching, and genetic swamping from the related and more common S. wetlandicus.
