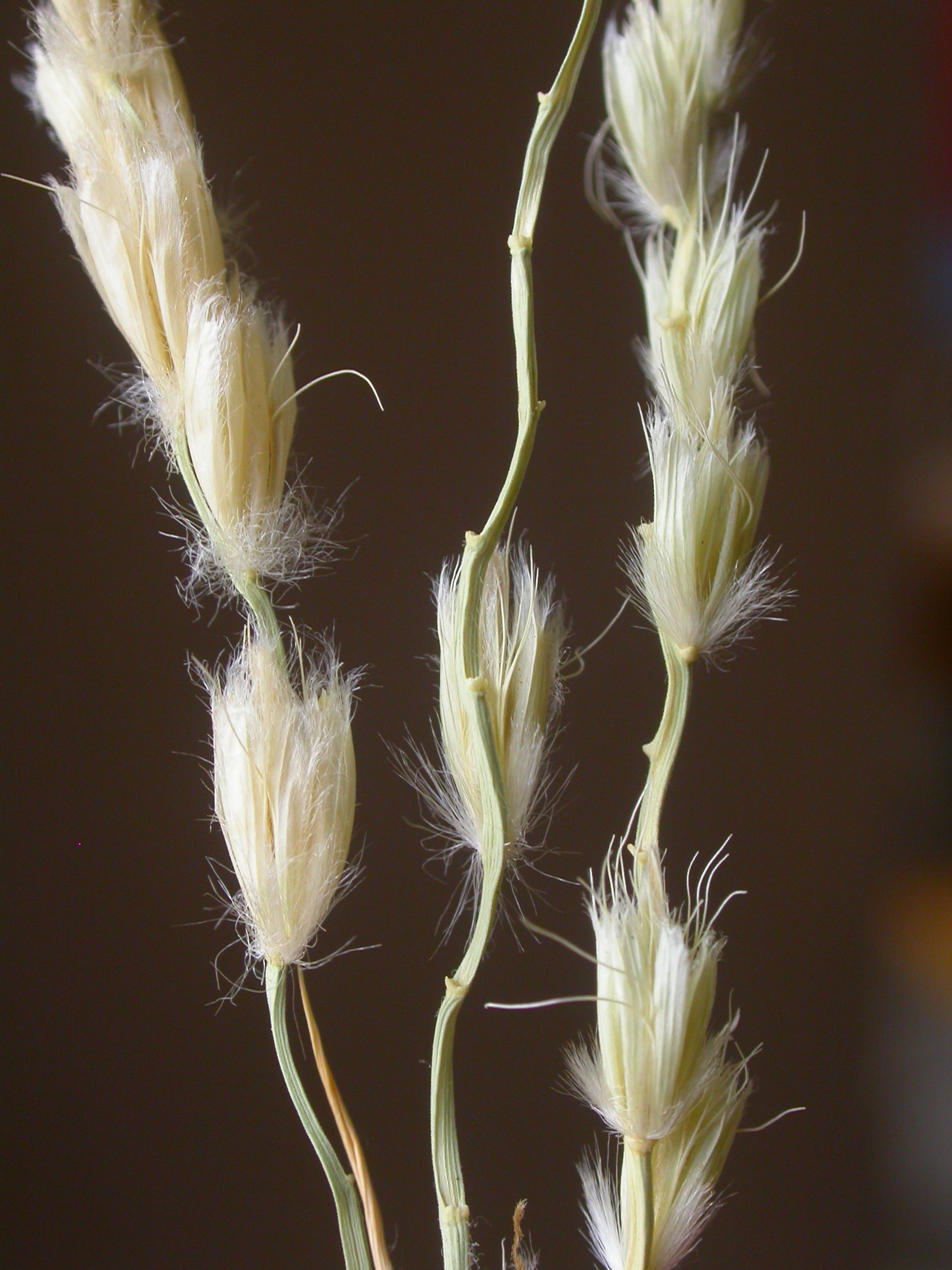

Scientific classification
- Kingdom: Plantae
- Clade: Tracheophytes
- Clade: Angiosperms
- Clade: Monocots
- Clade: Commelinids
- Order: Poales
- Family: Poaceae
- Subfamily: Chloridoideae
- Genus: Hilaria
- Species: H. rigida

Binomial name
- Hilaria rigida (Thurb.) Benth. ex Scribn.

Synonyms
- Pleuraphis rigida Thurb.

= Hilaria rigida =

Species of grass

Hilaria rigida (formerly Pleuraphis rigida) is a species of clumping perennial grass that is widespread in California deserts. It is commonly known as big galleta. It is a monocot in the Hilaria genus of the grass family (Poaceae).

It can be recognized after seed dispersal by the wiry, wavy inflorescence stalks (flexuose) that continue to stick out of the clump of leaf blades. The stems are unusual among grasses in that they are solid, even between the nodes, whereas most grasses have hollow stems.

The clumps help stabilize sand dunes. According to botanist Philip A. Munz, "it is said to be one of the most valuable forage grasses of the desert". Clumps can live more than 100 years.

== Habitat, range, and distribution ==
Big galleta is found in sand dunes, bajadas, scrublands, woodlands, and deserts. It prefers dry, open, sandy to rocky slopes and flats. It occurs on all soil types, but has poor growth in clay soils. It is tolerant of arid environments such as desert floors, and it is the dominant grass in some desert scrub regions. It is found on plains, in sand dunes, and on rocky hillsides. It grows from sea level to about 1,600 m (5,200 ft). In the Mojave Desert, it grows up to 1,220 m (4,000 ft).

It is common in creosote bush scrub, joshua tree woodland, and blackbrush scrub plant communities, and areas with sandy soils, such as the Kelso sand dunes. In the eastern Mojave Desert, it is more common than its relative, galleta grass (Pleuraphis jamesii).

It is a common native to the Mojave Desert and Sonoran Desert to Sonora, Mexico. It can be found in California, Arizona into northern Mexico, Colorado, Utah, less commonly, but also in other parts of Mexico and rarely in sand dunes in Utah's Washington and Kane Counties.

== Description ==
=== Growth pattern ===
Hilaria rigida is a long-lived, shrubby or bushy, clumping perennial grass producing coarse, erect stems reaching 1 m (3.3 ft) in maximum height. It spreads from hard, woody rhizomes to form grayish, hairy, open, erect hummocks and clumps. The clumps can live to more than 100 years old. Its primary means of reproduction is by rhizomes, possibly also by tillering. It has a bush-like appearance because it is highly branched at the base. Clumping results from spread by tillers or short rhizomes. Clumps of leaves are 3 to 4 ft (0.91 to 1.22 m) wide. Seeds fall when mature, but their stalks persist, sticking out from the clumps like zigzagging wires, by which the plant can be identified at a distance.

It is drought tolerant and very fast growing after rains. It typically undergoes two major growth periods, one after winter rains, the other after summer monsoons. It is reported to be more effective than many other desert plants at extracting water from the soil during dry periods.

=== Roots, stems, and leaves ===
Roots are shallow and radiate outward from the base of the plant.

Fuzzy to wooly stems are stiff, heavy, and coarse, from 12 to 40 in (300 to 1,020 mm) long. The stems are unusual among grasses in that they are solid, even between the nodes, whereas most grasses have hollow stems. They can be either erect or lying on the ground (decumbent). Stems have nodes that are lined with long, sometimes curly hairs.

Leaf blades are coarse and firm, fairly wide, and almost straight, from grayish to blue-green, sometimes with light wooly fuzz, and have curly hairs and edges that are rolled upward. They are from 1.0 to 2.5 in (2.5 to 6.4 cm) long. Leaves are attached either to the base of the plant or along the upright stems that bear the heads of seeds.

=== Inflorescence and fruit ===
The inflorescence is a series of hairy or brush-like rectangular spikelets, occur in clusters of three, between 2 and 3 in (5.1 and 7.6 cm). The grass produces relatively few viable seeds and spreads mostly by its tillers and sometimes via rhizomes. The inflorescence stalk persists after the seeds drop, sticking out of the clump of leaf blades like stiff, wavy wires.

It blooms between December and January according to some sources, from May to June in the Mojave Desert according to others, and from February through June in the Mohave Desert according to others. The variation may result from a paucity of information on germination characteristics (as of 2014).

Seedlings rarely become established. The head of seeds is a spike of seeds with much chaff.

Spikes are 1.5 to 4.0 in (3.8 to 10.2 cm) long.

== Ecology ==
The hummocky, clumpy form of the grass helps it stabilize loose and blowing sand when it grows in desert dune habitat. It acts as a nurse plant to seedlings of other species, such as cholla and barrel cactus, in turn receiving protection from herbivory by growing next to the spiny plants. It is not palatable to elk and waterfowl.

Associated plant species include Larrea tridentata (creosote bush), Ambrosia dumosa (white bursage), Coleogyne ramosissima (blackbrush), Yucca brevifolia (joshua trees), Yucca species, Krameria erecta (range ratany), Krascheninnikovia (winterfat), Encelia farinosa (brittle bush), Ephedra species, Lycium andersonii (wolfberry), and Sphaeralcea (globemallow).

== Uses ==
Big galleta is heavily grazed and is valuable as a fair to good forage crop for sheep and cattle. Botanist Philip A. Munz commented that "it is said to be one of the most valuable forage grasses of the desert". It resprouts after grazing followed by rains, and coarseness and clumping help protect it from trampling.

It is used for erosion control and in revegetation efforts.
