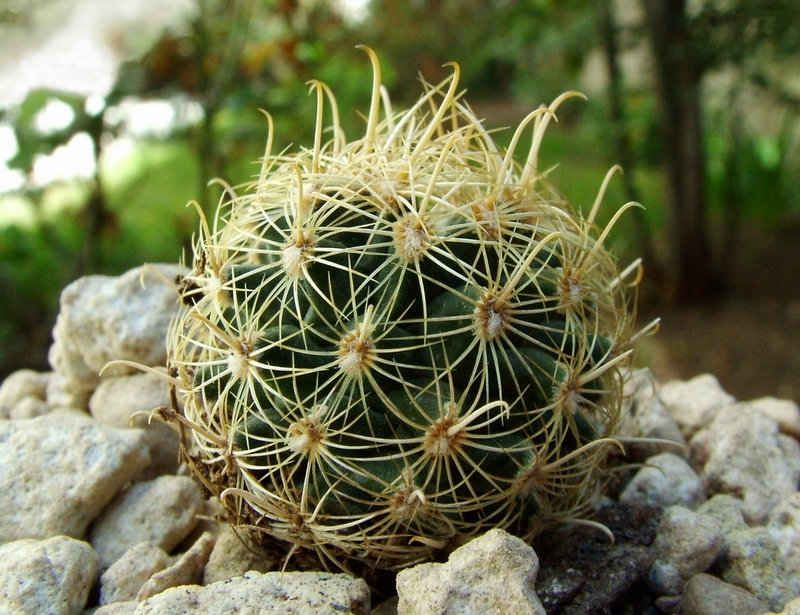
- Sclerocactus brevihamatus subsp. tobuschii

Conservation status
- Apparently Secure (NatureServe)

Scientific classification
- Kingdom: Plantae
- Clade: Tracheophytes
- Clade: Angiosperms
- Clade: Eudicots
- Order: Caryophyllales
- Family: Cactaceae
- Subfamily: Cactoideae
- Genus: Sclerocactus
- Species: S. brevihamatus

Binomial name
- Sclerocactus brevihamatus (Engelm.) D.R.Hunt

= Sclerocactus brevihamatus =

Species of cactus

Sclerocactus brevihamatus is a species of cactus known by the common name shorthook fishhook cactus.

It is endemic to Texas, and is an endangered species. Threats to the species and subspecies include collecting and development in its habitat.

== Description ==
Sclerocactus brevihamatus is a small, dark-green to grey globose cactus. It has a short, central taproot with many fine, fibrous offshoots. Its stem has 10–12 ribs, divided into tubercles with shallow, wooly grooves on the upper surface. The areoles are circular with white-colored wool. Its central spines are white or yellowish, and often hooked, occasionally red-tipped, and may become grey as they age. The radial spines are straight and irregularly spread. Its small, funnelform flowers vary in color from shades of green, yellow, and white. The fruits are egg-shaped and pinkish-green, and contain kidney-shaped, dark brown to black seeds.

== Habitat ==
Sclerocactus brevihamatus grows in shallow, gravel and clay soils. It prefers slightly alkaline soils, and often grows in soils heavy with limestone sediments. Its natural habitat is open areas with sparse vegetation, such as hilltops, floodplains, and rocky plains.

== Subspecies ==
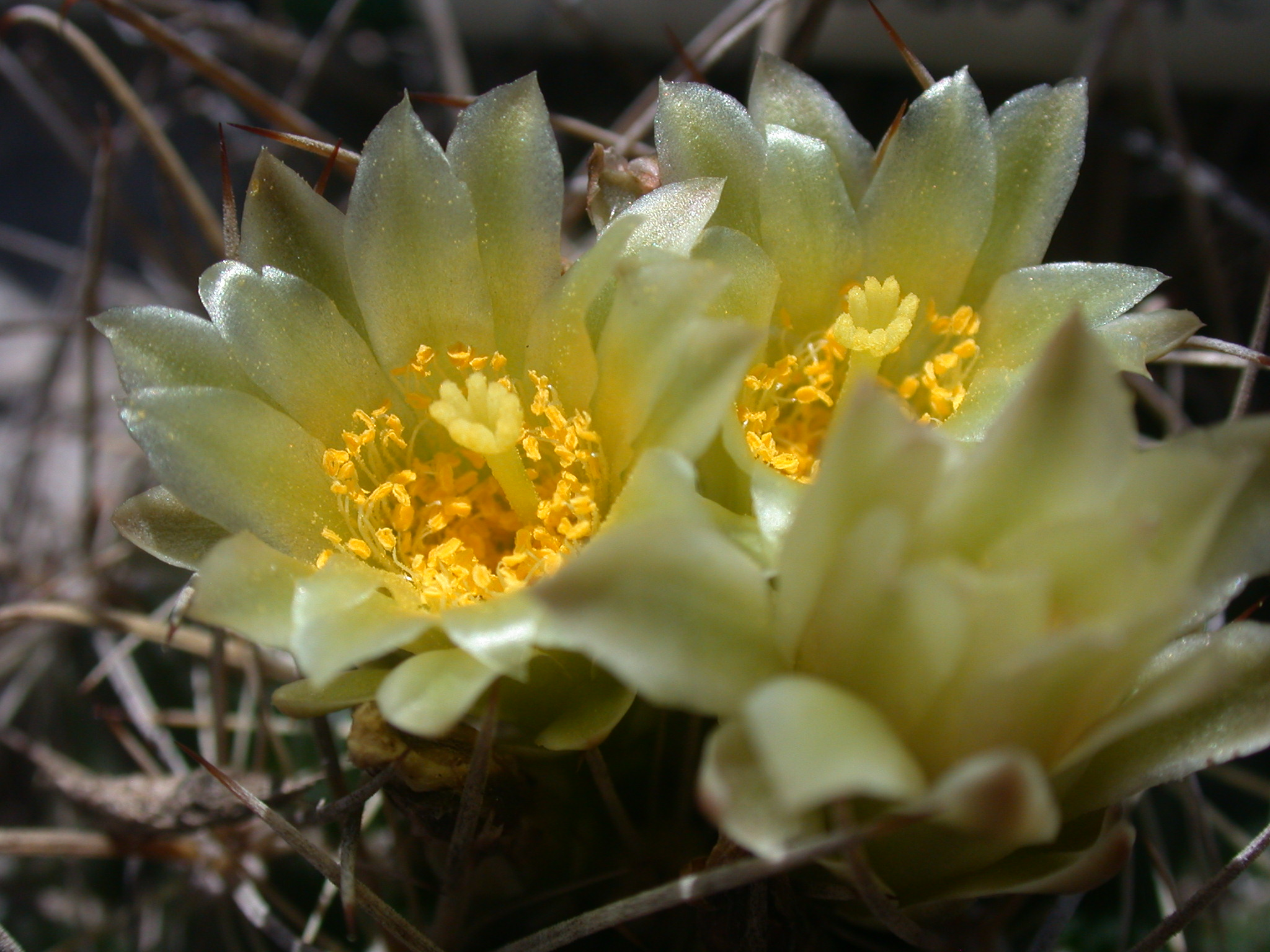
Tobusch fishhook cactus flowers

Subspecies and varieties of this cactus include:

- Sclerocactus brevihamatus subsp. brevihamatus – shorthook fishhook cactus.
- Sclerocactus brevihamatus var. pallidus – synonym of Sclerocactus brevihamatus, also known as Ancistrocactus brevihamatus var. pallidus.
- Sclerocactus brevihamatus subsp. tobuschii – Tobusch fishhook cactus. It is also known as a separate species, Ancistrocactus tobuschii.

== Taxonomy ==
The rare Tobusch fishhook cactus was federally listed as endangered species, but has been moved to threatened species since the discovery of many more plants. It was known from about 200 to about 500 individual specimens on the eastern part of the Edwards Plateau. New plant discoveries have augmented that number to over 3000. It occurs in the Juniperus ashei-Quercus fusiformis plant association on calcareous soils.
