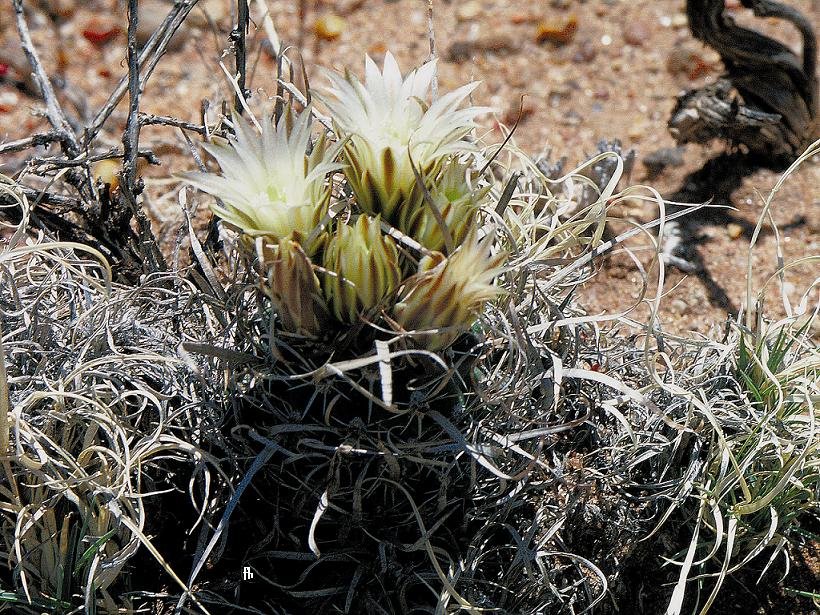

Conservation status
- Apparently Secure (NatureServe)
- CITES Appendix I (CITES)

Scientific classification
- Kingdom: Plantae
- Clade: Tracheophytes
- Clade: Angiosperms
- Clade: Eudicots
- Order: Caryophyllales
- Family: Cactaceae
- Subfamily: Cactoideae
- Genus: Sclerocactus
- Species: S. papyracanthus

Binomial name
- Sclerocactus papyracanthus (Engelm.) N.P.Taylor

Synonyms
- Echinocactus papyracanthus Mammillaria papyracantha Pediocactus papyracanthus Toumeya papyracantha

= Sclerocactus papyracanthus =

Species of cactus

Sclerocactus papyracanthus is a species of cactus known by the common names paperspine fishhook cactus, grama grass cactus, paper-spined cactus, and toumeya. It is native to North America, where it occurs from Arizona to New Mexico to Texas and into Chihuahua, Northeastern Mexico.

== Description ==
Sclerocactus papyracanthus is small cactus grows up to 8 centimeters tall by 2.5 wide. It is covered in so many spines they obscure the stems beneath. They are white, tan, or gray in color, papery in texture, and sometimes twisted or wavy in shape.

The actual shape of the flower is an oval pedal. The flower is up to 2.5 centimeters long and have light-colored outer tepals with dark midstripes. The fruit is green and dry at maturity.

== Distribution and habitat ==
This plant grows in pinyon-juniper woodland and Chihuahuan Desert grassland habitat, usually amidst grama grass (Bouteloua spp.), especially blue grama (Bouteloua gracilis). It is often hard to see the cactus because its spines look like the leaves of the grass.
