= Amiel Weeks Whipple =

American military officer and topographical engineer (1817–1863)

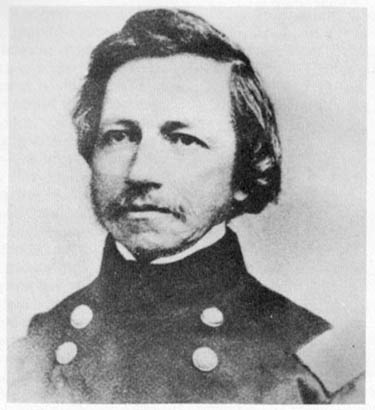
- Amiel Weeks Whipple
- Born: October 21, 1817; Greenwich, Massachusetts
- Died: May 7, 1863 (aged 44); Washington, D.C.
- Burial place: Proprietors' Cemetery, Portsmouth, New Hampshire
- Military career
- Allegiance: United States of America; Union
- Branch: United States Army; Union Army
- Service years: 1841–1863
- Rank: Major General
- Conflicts: American Civil War

Amiel Weeks Whipple (October 21, 1817 – May 7, 1863) was an American military officer and topographical engineer. He served as a brigadier general in the American Civil War, where he was mortally wounded at the Battle of Chancellorsville. Among his many survey assignments for the US War Department, he participated in the difficult survey of the new United States and Mexico boundary and led the survey of a possible transcontinental railroad route along the 35th parallel from Arkansas to Los Angeles.

== Biography ==
Whipple was born to David and Abigail Brown (Pepper) Whipple in Greenwich, Massachusetts. He grew up in Concord, Massachusetts, where his father owned an inn. He was teaching school at Concord in 1834 when he applied to the United States Military Academy at West Point. After he was turned down by the academy, he attended Amherst College until 1837, when he was finally accepted to West Point. Whipple graduated fifth in the class of 1841. His early career included surveying the Patapsco River, sounding and mapping the approaches to New Orleans, and surveying Portsmouth Harbor. From 1844 to 1849, he was assigned to a survey of the northeastern boundary of the United States, serving under James Duncan Graham.

In 1848, Whipple was assigned to the United States Boundary Commission, tasked with surveying the new boundary between the US and Mexico resulting from the Mexican–American War. For a time, he served as the interim chief surveyor for the commission until William H. Emory was named to the position. Heading east from San Diego, the survey parties traveled through some of the most rugged and remote terrain in the country. Compounding the difficulty was the extreme desert heat and hostile Apache Indians. Whipple accomplished his assigned surveys in spite of these challenges and was promoted to first lieutenant on April 24, 1851. By 1853, his survey work was complete and his reports had been written.

In 1853, Congress authorized the Pacific Railroad Surveys to select the best route for a transcontinental railroad. Whipple was directed to lead one of those surveys along the 35th parallel from Fort Smith, Arkansas, to Los Angeles. The Whipple expedition left Fort Smith on July 15, 1853, with a group of seventy men, including soldiers, teamsters, and scientists. Among the scientists were John Milton Bigelow, a medical doctor and botanist; Jules Marcou, a Swiss geologist; and Balduin Möllhausen, a German artist and a protege of Alexander von Humboldt. Whipple's party made good progress through Indian Territory (now Oklahoma), the Texas panhandle and the New Mexico Territory, reaching Albuquerque on October 5. After Albuquerque, they were joined by frontiersman Antoine Leroux who helped to guide the surveyors through the most difficult part of the journey to California. They reached California on February 7 after a near-disastrous crossing of the Colorado River, then crossed the Mojave Desert and reached Los Angeles on March 20, 1854.

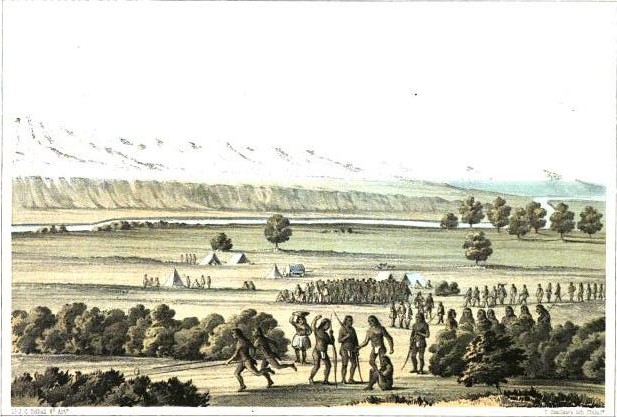
A drawing from the Whipple Expedition (1853 to 1854) which shows Whipple with the southwest Indian tribe.

The findings of the Whipple expedition, along with those of the other transcontinental survey parties, were published by the government in a massive twelve-volume report titled the Pacific Railroad Reports. In addition to reports on topography, geology, botany and zoology, Whipple wrote a lengthy essay on the southwestern Indian tribes that the expedition had encountered.

Whipple was promoted to captain in 1855 and then assigned to supervise efforts to open the Great Lakes to navigation by larger vessels, deepening channels through the St. Clair flats and the St. Marys River. He was also commander of the lighthouse districts from Lake Superior to the St. Lawrence River.

At the outbreak of the Civil War, Whipple served for a time under General Irvin McDowell as commander of the nascent balloon reconnaissance unit. He made a balloon ascent over the Confederate lines at Bull Run. He then became chief topographical engineer under General George B. McClellan in the Army of the Potomac. His maps were used on many Virginia battlefields. In 1862, as brigadier general of volunteers, he led the defense of Washington, D.C., on its Virginia side. In September 1862, Whipple was assigned to the III Corps, and on December 13–15, participated in the Battle of Fredericksburg. Whipple was severely wounded by a sharpshooter at Chancellorsville on May 4, 1863, received last rites on the battlefield, and was taken to Washington. Just before Whipple's death on May 7, President Abraham Lincoln, a friend of Whipple's, promoted him to major general of volunteers. Lincoln rode in an open carriage as part of Whipple's funeral cortege. He was later awarded posthumously more brevets for his wartime services, and both of his sons received presidential appointments to the military academy of their choice. He was buried in the Proprietors' Cemetery, Portsmouth, New Hampshire.

== Commemoration ==
Whipple was memorialized with the naming of two forts, Fort Whipple, Arizona Territory and Fort Whipple, Arlington County, Virginia (now Fort Myer). In California, Whipple Peak was named in his honor by Joseph C. Ives, a surveyor who served with Whipple on the Mexican boundary survey.

Numerous plant taxa were named in his honor, including the genus Whipplea and species Hesperoyucca whipplei, and Sclerocactus whipplei.

The fish Cyprinella whipplei Girard, 1856 was named after him, as well as Etheostoma whipplei.

== See also ==
- List of American Civil War generals (Union)
- List of Massachusetts generals in the American Civil War
