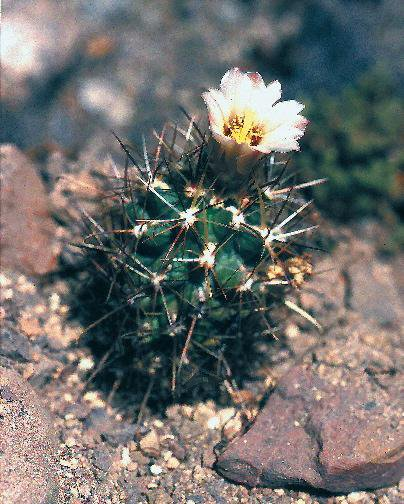

Conservation status
- Imperiled (NatureServe)
- CITES Appendix I (CITES)

Scientific classification
- Kingdom: Plantae
- Clade: Tracheophytes
- Clade: Angiosperms
- Clade: Eudicots
- Order: Caryophyllales
- Family: Cactaceae
- Subfamily: Cactoideae
- Genus: Sclerocactus
- Species: S. wrightiae

Binomial name
- Sclerocactus wrightiae L.D.Benson

= Sclerocactus wrightiae =

Species of cactus

Sclerocactus wrightiae is a rare species of cactus known by the common names Wright's little barrel cactus and Wright's fishhook cactus.

Dr. Lyman Benson named this species for North American cactus expert Dorde Wright Woodruff, who initially discovered it in 1961 and brought it to the attention of Dr. Benson. Dr. Benson and Ms. Woodruff later collaborated in connection with other Sclerocactus taxa in the Intermountain West.

== Distribution ==
It is endemic to Utah in the United States, where it is known only from Emery, Sevier, Wayne, and Garfield Counties. It occurs at Capitol Reef National Park and the San Rafael Swell. It is numerous threats and is federally listed as an endangered species of the United States (listed under the Endangered Species Act on October 11, 1979).

This plant grows in shrublands on a specific type of soil. It is usually fine or sandy in texture and there is a large amount of material scattered on the land, including pebbles, gravel, and fossil oyster shells. An important component of the substrate is the cryptobiotic crust that lies on top. The cactus is absent from areas where this crust has been destroyed.

== Description ==
Sclerocactus wrightiae has stems 4–12 cm tall that are depressed-hemispheric to obovoid to short-cylindric (but not becoming tall-cylindric). Flowers are 2 to 3.5 cm long, yellowish to white or pink. Filaments are red-violet. Flower buds are reddish-brown and rounded prior to anthesis and elongating and becoming pointed just prior to flowering as with other smaller species of Scerocactus.

== Conservation ==
Threats to the species include damage to the habitat during hydrocarbon exploration and the mining of coal, gypsum, bentonite and bentonite clay, uranium, vanadium, building stone and gravel. Livestock activity, such as trampling and uprooting of plants, may be a threat. Off-road vehicle use causes damage. Poaching is also a significant problem. The cactus also suffers from natural predation by the beetle Moneilema semipunctatum which has been exacerbated by climate change.

Small mammals such as Ord's kangaroo rat (Dipodomys ordii) and White-tailed antelope squirrel (Ammospermophilus leucurus) may eat the cactus.
