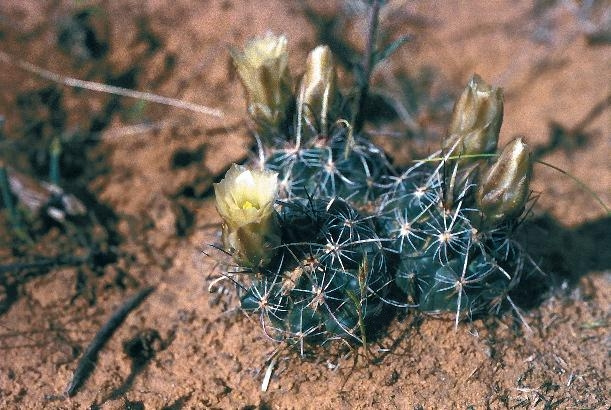

Conservation status
- CITES Appendix I (CITES)

Scientific classification
- Kingdom: Plantae
- Clade: Tracheophytes
- Clade: Angiosperms
- Clade: Eudicots
- Order: Caryophyllales
- Family: Cactaceae
- Subfamily: Cactoideae
- Genus: Sclerocactus
- Species: S. sileri

Binomial name
- Sclerocactus sileri (L.D.Benson) K.D.Heil & J.M.Porter

= Sclerocactus sileri =

Species of cactus

Sclerocactus sileri, the Siler fishhook cactus, is a rare and very small cactus found mostly in mineral-rich desert areas of intermediate elevations, notably in the American states of Utah, Nevada, and northern Arizona.

== Description ==
Sclerocactus sileri grows to about 25 cm tall and 12 cm wide. The cactus also shows a flower of diameter about 20 mm (1 in), with whitish or yellowish petals that show venation in a purple color. Flowering occurs in the spring season.

Sclerocactus sileri has both central and radial spines. Central spines have length up to about 15 to 30 mm (1 to 1 in) and are brownish-black in color. There are four central spines (4-5 per areole), where the lower central spine is white, abaxial central spines are tinged, is gray-purplish, angled, and strongly hooked and slightly contorted. Central spines are 1.2–3 cm long and 0.5–1 mm wide, curving towards the ground. The two lateral spines are flattened and thicker. The upper central spine is white to tan and is curved and strongly flattened.

Radial spines have length up to about 10 to 20 mm (0 to 1 in) and are white in color. There are about 6-8 radial spines per areole which are acicular.

Seeds are black to light brown in color, and are 2.2-2.5 mm wide, with a rounded papillae.

Flowers and fruits of Sclerocactus sileri are very similar to others of the same family, such as S. whipplei or S. pubispinus. The phenology of the flowers from Sclerocactus sileri bloom during the months of April and May, while the fruits during the months of May and June. Flowers are 2.5–3 cm (1-1.2 in) long and 2.5–3 cm in diameter, with a glabrous exterior floral tube. The outer tepals have brownish and yellowish margins, the larger oblanceolate, 10–15 mm long, mucronate, marginally membranous and crisped or minutely toothed. The inner tepals are yellow, sometimes suffused with brown, the largest lanceolate, 15–25 mm long and mucronate. The filaments are white or greenish white, 7–10 mm long, anthers yellow, about 1 mm long; style yellowish-green, 14–20 mm long; stigma lobes 5-8 and about 1.2-2.5 mm long; ovary 3–7 mm long at anthesis; scales few, membranous, scarious-margined, minutely toothed or fringed. The fruit is green, turning red, ovoid, dry, and 0.8-2.2 cm long. Fruits extend longitudinally, along two to four ventral slits. Black seeds are 2.75–3 mm in diameter and 2.25- 2.5 mm long.

== Taxonomy ==
The names Sclerocactus sileri and Pediocactus sileri have a confused relationship in the literature. (Sclerocactus was included in Pediocactus by Arp in 1972, but this was not accepted by authorities well conversant in the Cactaceae.) According to the treatment in the Flora of North America, the taxon described here was first named by L.D. Benson (in 1969) as the variety sileri of Sclerocactus pubispinus. It was raised to a full species under the name Sclerocactus sileri by K.D. Heil and J.M. Porter in 1994. Quite separately, Echinocactus sileri was first described in 1896 and transferred to Pediocactus sileri by L.D. Benson in 1961. The two taxa are treated as two separate species in the Flora of North America, which has entries for:

- Sclerocactus sileri (L.D. Benson) K.D. Heil & J M. Porter – Siler fishhook cactus
- Pediocactus sileri (Engelmann ex J.M. Coulter) L.D. Benson – Gypsum cactus, Siler's pincushion cactus

Mistakenly, Anderson (2001) describes only one species, under the name Sclerocactus sileri, treating Pediocactus sileri as a synonym. His description largely matches the description of Pediocactus sileri in the Flora of North America, and he uses the same common names (gypsum cactus, Siler's pincushion cactus) although the distribution he gives ("a very restricted area in Coconino County, Arizona") corresponds to that of Sclerocactus sileri in the Flora of North America ("restricted to northeast Coconino County, Arizona").

== Distribution ==
Sclerocactus sileri is narrowly distributed. It has been seen in only Arizona, U.S.A, in Coconino County, although it is very close to the Utah border. See Sclerocactus sileri (L. D. Benson) K. D. Heil & J. M. Porter, Haseltonia. 2: 39. 1994.

== Habitat and ecology ==
Sclerocactus sileri is a vascular plant, found in habitats including scrubs, forests, grasslands, and especially desert shrubs. It grows in drier soils that are rich in minerals such as gypsum and salt, and typically in sandy soils derived from Moenkopi Formation. Sclerocactus sileri grow in grama grass. The following plants are usually associated with the Sclerocactus sileri: drop seed (Sporobolus), yucca (Yucca), hedgehog cactus (Echinocereus), sagebrush (Artemisia), snakeweed (Gutierrezia), pinyon (Pinus edulis), and juniper (Juniperus). Sclerocactus sileri grows in the form of perennial succulent.

Sclerocactus sileri is native to the western United States, and habitat elevations typically range from 850 to 1,650 meters.

== Usage ==
Sclerocactus sileri has no known uses for humans.
