= Sclerocactus johnsonii subsp. erectocentrus =

Conservation status
- Vulnerable (NatureServe)
- CITES Appendix I

Scientific classification
- Kingdom: Plantae
- Clade: Tracheophytes
- Clade: Angiosperms
- Clade: Eudicots
- Order: Caryophyllales
- Family: Cactaceae
- Subfamily: Cactoideae
- Genus: Sclerocactus
- Species: S. johnsonii
- Subspecies: S. j. subsp. erectocentrus

Trinomial name
- Sclerocactus johnsonii subsp. erectocentrus (J.M.Coult.) M.A.Baker

Synonyms
- Echinocactus beguinii F.A.C.Weber ex K.Schum.; Echinocactus erectocentrus J.M.Coult.; Echinocactus krausei Hildm. ex Mathsson; Echinomastus erectocentrus (J.M.Coult.) Britton & Rose; Echinomastus krausei (Hildm. ex Mathsson) Berger ex Borg; Gymnocactus beguinii (F.A.C.Weber ex K.Schum.) Backeb.; Neolloydia beguinii (F.A.C.Weber ex K.Schum.) Britton & Rose; Neolloydia beguinii var. senilis (Josefski) F.M.Knuth; Neolloydia erectocentra (J.M.Coult.) L.D.Benson; Neolloydia smithii var. beguinii (F.A.C.Weber ex K.Schum.) Kladiwa & Fittkau; Pediocactus erectocentrus (J.M.Coult.) Halda; Sclerocactus erectocentrus (J.M.Coult.) N.P.Taylor; Thelocactus erectocentrus (J.M.Coult.) W.T.Marshall; Thelocactus krausei (Hildm. ex Mathsson) H.P.Kelsey & Dayton

Species of cactus

Sclerocactus johnsonii subsp. erectocentrus, synonyms including Echinomastus erectocentrus, is a subspecies of cactus, known by the common names redspine fishhook cactus, redspine butterfly cactus, acuña cactus, needle-spine pineapple cactus, red pineapple cactus, and purple-spine viznagita. It is native to Arizona in the United States.

This cactus grows up to about 34 cm (13.4 in) tall by 10 cm (3.9 in) wide. There are many spines on each areole, the central ones up to 4.4 cm (1.7 in) long. The spines are purple, pink, or white with brown tips. The flower is up to 6 cm (2.4 in) long by 9 cm (3.5 in) wide and has white, pink, or lavender tepals with greenish, brown, or reddish coloration at the bases. It is the first cactus to bloom in Organ Pipe Cactus National Monument, flowering in early March.

This species grows on limestone.

Sclerocactus johnsonii subsp. acunensis is not easily distinguished from S. johnsonii subsp. erectocentrus using morphological characteristics, but they occur in different geographical areas. The former occurs in northern Sonora and north to Florence, Arizona, and the latter occurs around Tucson and areas east.
