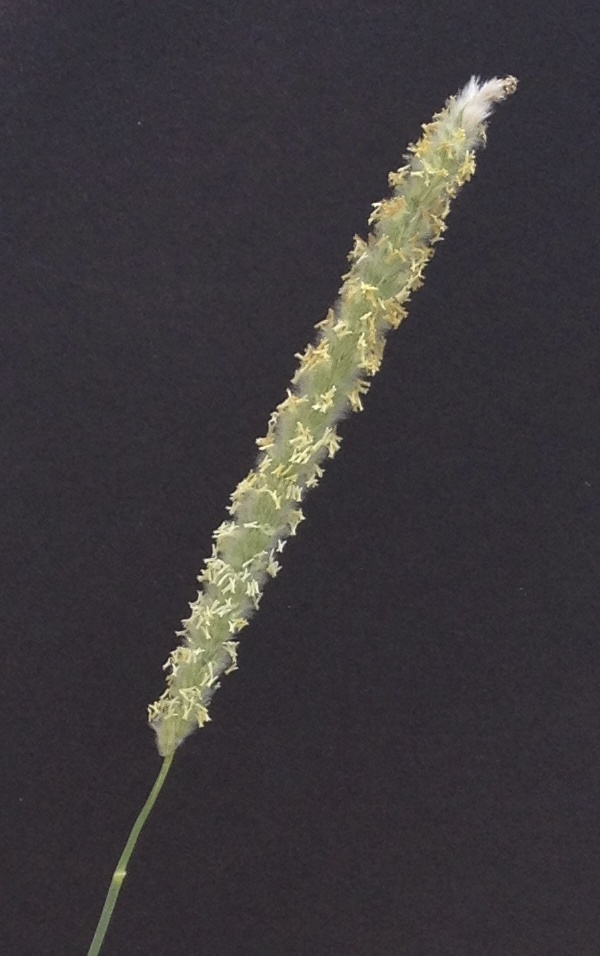

Scientific classification
- Kingdom: Plantae
- Clade: Tracheophytes
- Clade: Angiosperms
- Clade: Monocots
- Clade: Commelinids
- Order: Poales
- Family: Poaceae
- Subfamily: Panicoideae
- Genus: Anthephora
- Species: A. pubescens

Binomial name
- Anthephora pubescens Nees

= Anthephora pubescens =

Species of grass

Anthephora pubescens, with the common names bottle brush grass and wool grass, is a drought tolerant bunchgrass native to tropical and southern Africa.

Common names in other languages include: Afrikaans: Borseltjiegras, Khoekhoe: uruǀgâab, Otjiherero: otjimbele, German: Ästiges Kruggras.

== Taxonomy ==
Synonyms and former names include: Anthephora abyssinica A. Rich., Anthephora cenchroides (Hochst.) K. Schum. ex Engl., Anthephora elegans Rupr. ex Steud., Anthephora hochstetteri Nees ex Hochst., Anthephora kotschyi Hochst., Hypudaeurus cenchroides Hochst. ex A. Braun)

== Uses ==
This plant is cultivated especially for pasture rotation. In addition, it often makes a high quality hay, and it is also used forage source.
