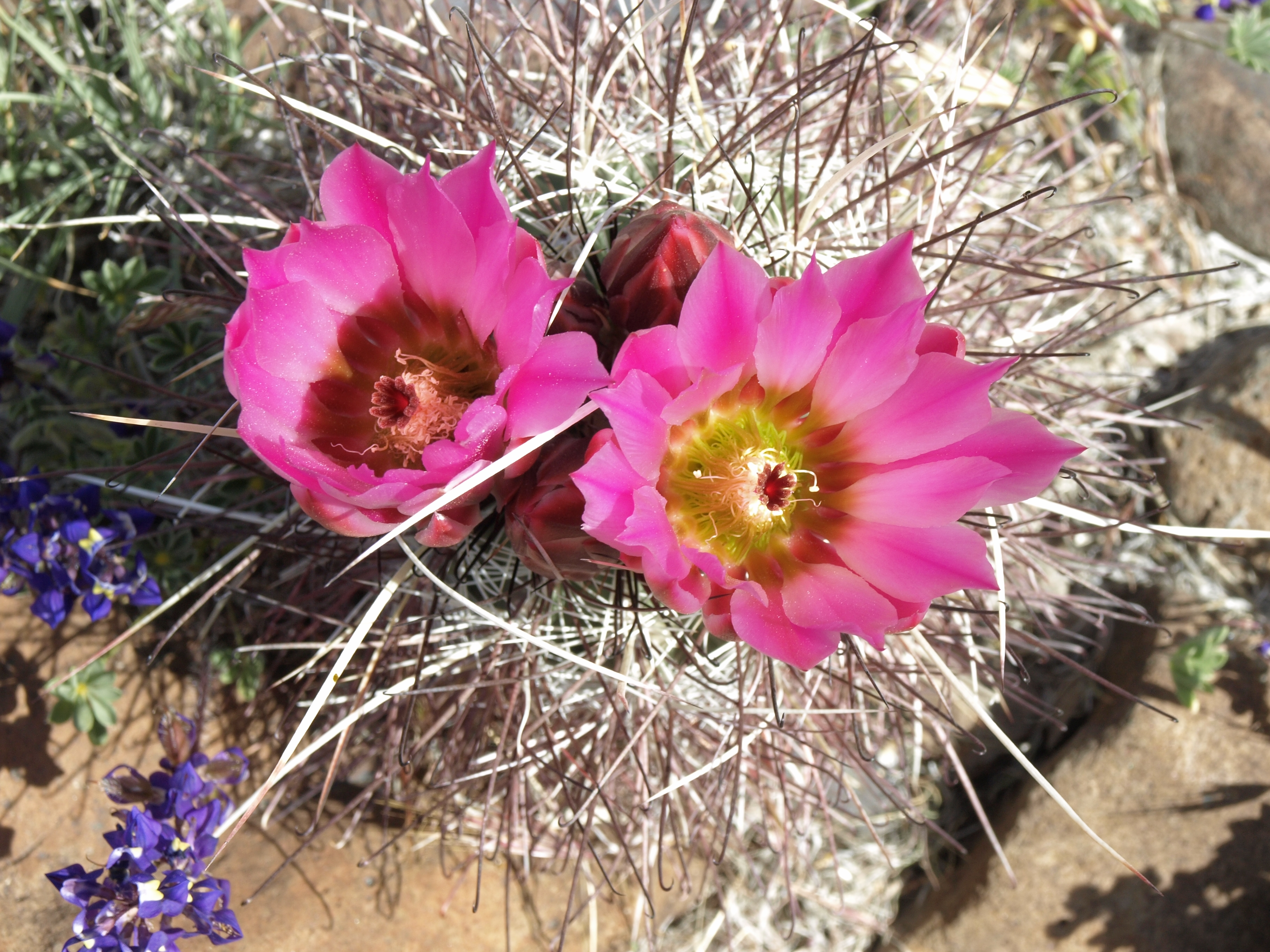

Conservation status
- Vulnerable (NatureServe)

- Least Concern (IUCN 3.1)

Scientific classification
- Kingdom: Plantae
- Clade: Tracheophytes
- Clade: Angiosperms
- Clade: Eudicots
- Order: Caryophyllales
- Family: Cactaceae
- Subfamily: Cactoideae
- Genus: Sclerocactus
- Species: S. polyancistrus

Binomial name
- Sclerocactus polyancistrus (Engelm. & Bigelow) Britton & Rose

Synonyms
- Echinocactus polyancistrus Engelm. & J.M.Bigelow; Ferocactus polyancistrus (Engelm. & J.M.Bigelow); Pediocactus polyancistrus (Engelm. & J.M.Bigelow)

= Sclerocactus polyancistrus =

Species of cactus

Sclerocactus polyancistrus, the Mohave fishhook cactus or redspined fishhook cactus, is a species of flowering cactus in the genus Sclerocactus. It is found in the Mojave Desert in the Southwestern United States.

== Description ==
The Sclerocactus polyancistrus cactus has a cylindrical stem up to 25 centimetres (9.8 in) tall by 8 centimetres (3.1 in) wide. They may grow in clusters. The cactus is densely spiny, each areole has several reddish or white central spines with hooked tips and several more white spines around the edge.

The fragrant flower is up to 10 centimetres (3.9 in) wide and may be most any shade of pink or red-violet. The scaly, fleshy fruit is 2 to 3 centimetres (0.79 to 1.18 in) long.

== Distribution and habitat ==
Sclerocactus polyancistrus is native to the Mojave Desert in eastern California and southern Nevada. It grows in rocky alluvial (often alkaline) soils and in Mojave desert scrub at elevations of 500–2,500 m (1,600–8,200 ft) above sea level.

== Conservation ==
As of December 2024, the conservation group NatureServe listed Sclerocactus polyancistrus as Vulnerable (G3) worldwide. This status was last reviewed on 30 December 2015. At the state level within the United States, the group assessed this species as Vulnerable (S3) in California and Imperiled (S2) in Nevada.

The IUCN Red List, another conservation group, assessed this species as Least Concern (LC) worldwide. Their assessment was last reviewed on 12 May 2010.

== Taxonomy ==
Sclerocactus polyancistrus was first described by George Engelmann and John Milton Bigelow under the name Echinocactus polyancistrus in 1856. In 1922, Nathaniel Lord Britton and Joseph Nelson Rose moved the species to the genus Sclerocactus, while keeping the specific epithet the same.

=== Etymology ===
In English, this species is commonly known as the Mohave fishhook cactus, or redspined fishhook cactus.
