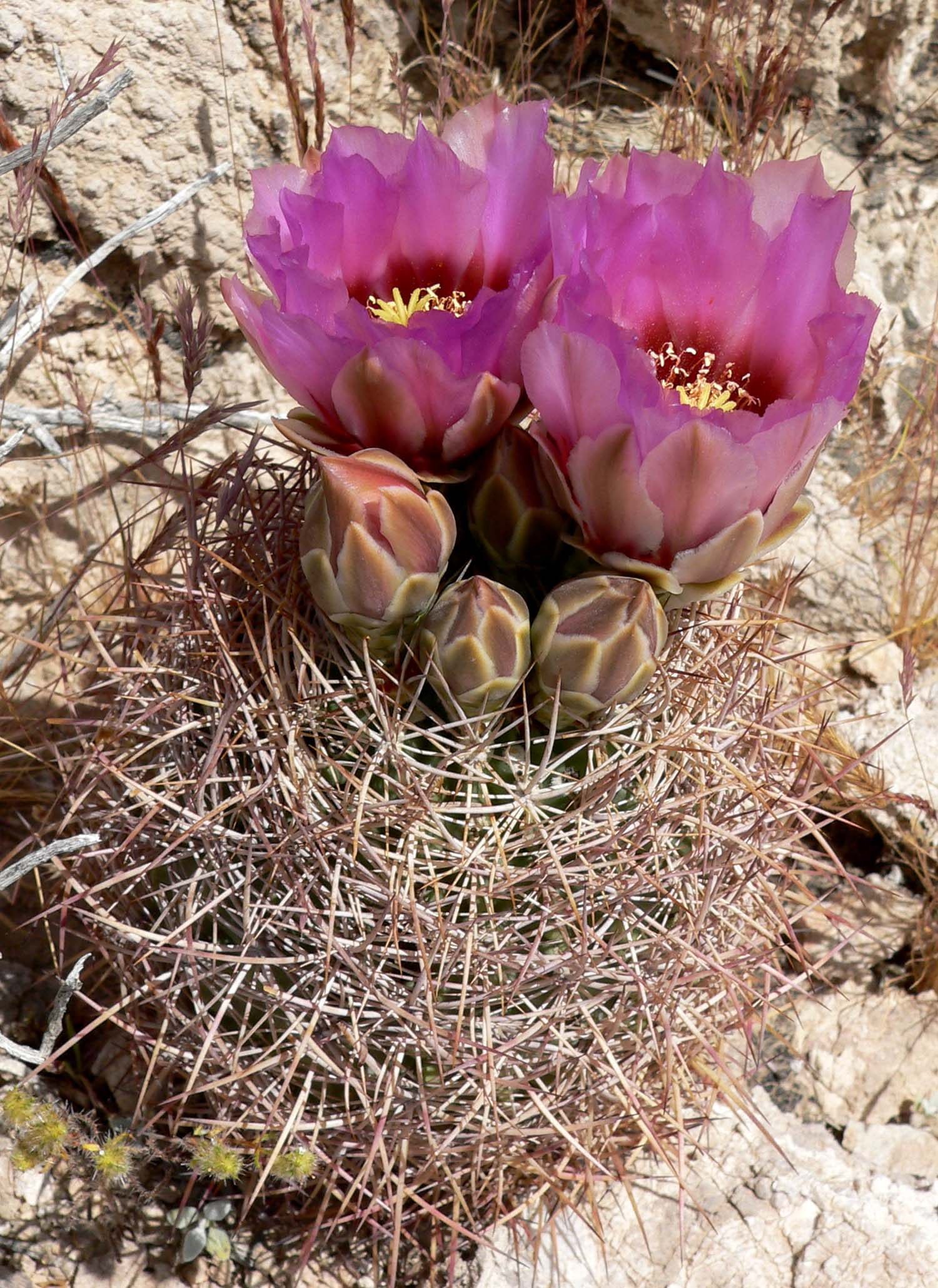

Scientific classification
- Kingdom: Plantae
- Clade: Tracheophytes
- Clade: Angiosperms
- Clade: Eudicots
- Order: Caryophyllales
- Family: Cactaceae
- Subfamily: Cactoideae
- Genus: Sclerocactus
- Species: S. johnsonii

Binomial name
- Sclerocactus johnsonii (Parry ex Engelm.) N.P.Taylor

Subspecies
- See text.

Synonyms
- Echinocactus johnsonii Parry ex Engelm.; Echinomastus johnsonii (Parry ex Engelm.) E.M.Baxter; Ferocactus johnsonii (Parry ex Engelm.) Britton & Rose; Neolloydia johnsonii (Parry ex Engelm.) L.D.Benson; Pediocactus johnsonii (Parry ex Engelm.) Halda; Thelocactus johnsonii (Parry ex Engelm.) W.T.Marshall

= Sclerocactus johnsonii =

Species of cactus

Sclerocactus johnsonii (synonyms including Echinomastus johnsonii) is a species of cactus known by the common names Johnson's beehive cactus and Johnson's fishhook cactus. It is native to the southwestern United States from eastern California to Utah and northwestern Mexico, where it can be found in desert scrub habitat. It produces an egg-shaped or cylindrical stem up to 25 centimetres (10 inches) tall by 10 centimetres (4 inches) wide. It is covered densely in straight and curving spines which may be up to 4 centimetres (1 1/2 inches) long and come in shades of yellow, gray, lavender, and pink or red, with up to 24 per areole. The cactus may have yellow or pink flowers; the species is sometimes divided into two varieties on the basis of flower color. Flowers are up to 8 centimetres (3 1/6 inches) wide. The scaly, fleshy fruit is up to 1.8 centimetres (3/4 inch) long.

== Subspecies ==
As of February 2024, Plants of the World Online accepted three subspecies:

- Sclerocactus johnsonii subsp. acunensis (W.T.Marshall) M.A.Baker & J.M.Porter
- Sclerocactus johnsonii subsp. erectocentrus (J.M.Coult.) M.A.Baker
- Sclerocactus johnsonii subsp. johnsonii
