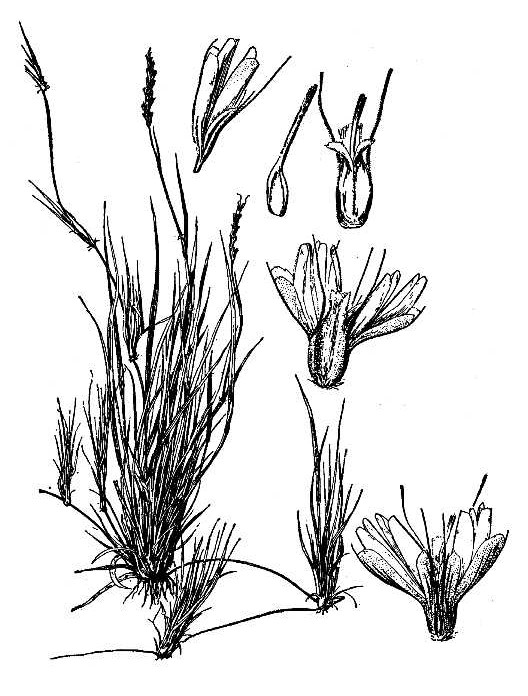

Conservation status
- Secure (NatureServe)

Scientific classification
- Kingdom: Plantae
- Clade: Tracheophytes
- Clade: Angiosperms
- Clade: Monocots
- Clade: Commelinids
- Order: Poales
- Family: Poaceae
- Subfamily: Chloridoideae
- Genus: Hilaria
- Species: H. belangeri

Binomial name
- Hilaria belangeri (Steud.) Nash

= Hilaria belangeri =

Species of flowering plant

Hilaria belangeri is a species of grass known by the common name curly mesquite, sometimes written curlymesquite or curly-mesquite. It is not related to mesquites, which are legumes. This grass is native to Mexico and the southwestern United States from Arizona to Texas.

This perennial grass forms tufts of stems growing up to about 30 cm tall. It forms a sod. It spreads by stolons which extend along the ground and root to grow new tufts. The grass has been known to spread 4 m in one season. This is the main method of reproduction in the plant because it is often sterile and rarely forms seeds. One of the two varieties, H. b. var. longifolia, does not form stolons, however.

This grass grows in a number of southwestern habitat types, such as desert grasslands, woodlands, and shrubsteppe. It is a dominant species on some grasslands. It tolerates a wide variety of soils. It tolerates low levels of precipitation as it typical of deserts, but not necessarily drought, during which it goes dormant.

This is an important forage for animals in some local regions. In central and western Texas, it is the main forage for cattle. Cattle find it very palatable. Wild ungulates such as pronghorn and deer graze on it. The grass is tolerant of grazing pressure, and even overgrazing. In some areas, it is productive early in the season, but most of its productivity occurs after summer rainfall.

The growth of this grass is inhibited by the introduced African plant sweet resin bush (Euryops multifidus).
