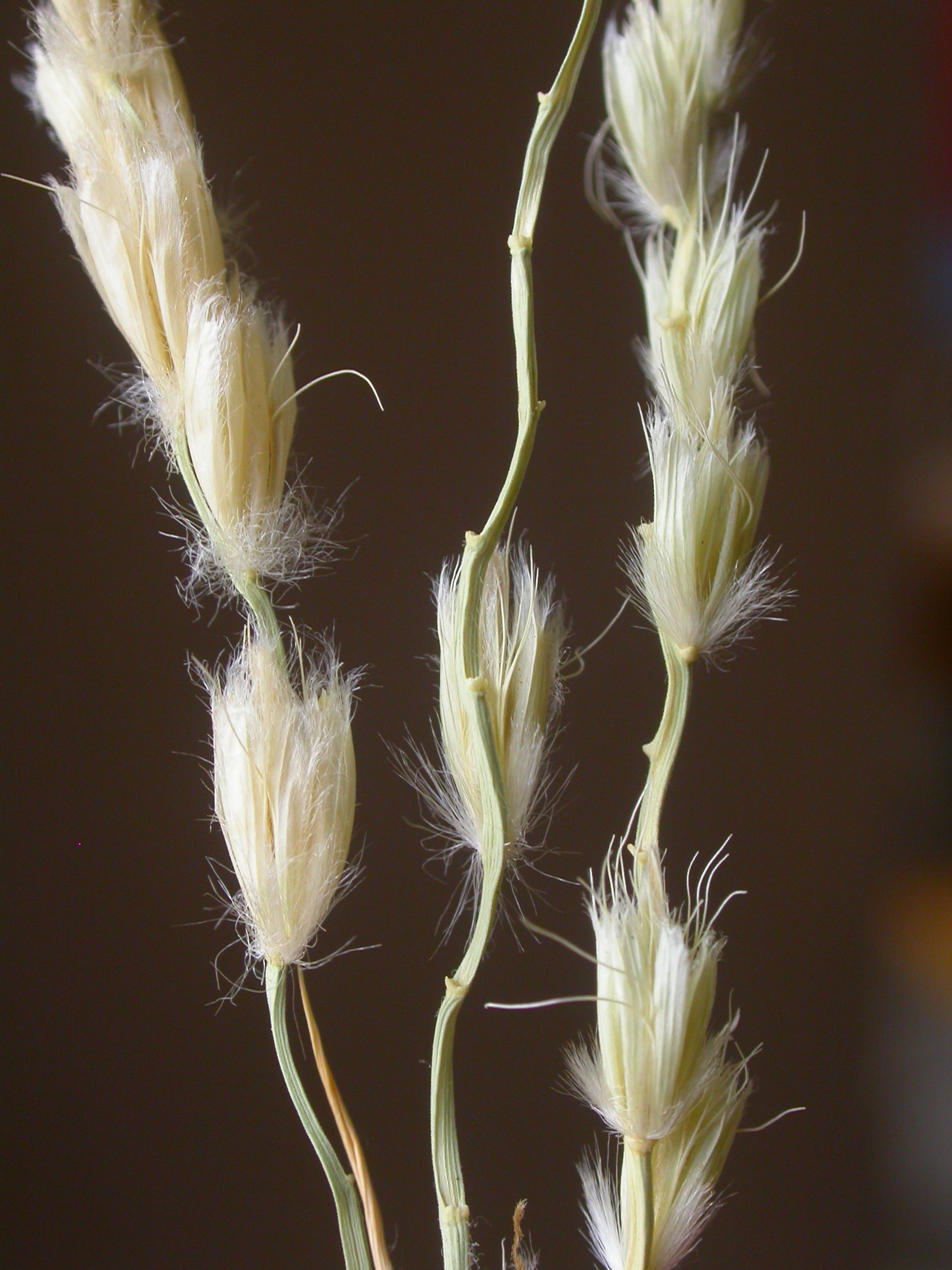
- Hilaria rigida

Scientific classification
- Kingdom: Plantae
- Clade: Tracheophytes
- Clade: Angiosperms
- Clade: Monocots
- Clade: Commelinids
- Order: Poales
- Family: Poaceae
- Subfamily: Chloridoideae
- Tribe: Cynodonteae
- Subtribe: Hilariinae; P.M.Peterson & Columbus
- Genus: Hilaria; Kunth

Type species
- Hilaria cenchroides Kunth

Synonyms
- Hexarrhena C.Presl; Schleropelta Buckley; Pleuraphis Torr.

= Hilaria (plant) =

Genus of flowering plants

Hilaria is a genus of North American plants in the grass family. Members of the genus are commonly known as curly mesquite. They are found in the Southwestern United States, Mexico, and Guatemala.

The generic name honors French naturalist Augustin Saint-Hilaire (1779–1853).

Species

- Hilaria annua Reeder & C.Reeder - Colima
- Hilaria belangeri (Steud.) Nash USA (Arizona, New Mexico, Texas) south to Oaxaca
- Hilaria cenchroides Kunth - from Chihuahua to Guatemala; naturalized in Arizona (Pima + Cochise Counties)
- Hilaria ciliata (Scribn.) Sohns - from Chihuahua to Oaxaca
- Hilaria hintonii Sohns - Guerrero, Morelos, Querétaro, México State
- Hilaria jamesii (Torr.) Benth. - United States (Arizona, California, Colorado, Kansas, Oklahoma, Nevada, New Mexico, Texas, Utah, Wyoming)
- Hilaria mutica (Buckley) Benth. - USA (Arizona, New Mexico, Oklahoma, Texas), Mexico (Chihuahua, Coahuila, Nuevo León, Durango, Zacatecas, Sonora, Baja California Sur)
- Hilaria rigida (Thurb.) Benth. ex Scribn. - United States (Arizona, California, Nevada, New Mexico, Utah), Mexico (Chihuahua, Sonora, Baja California)
- Hilaria semplei Sohns - Michoacán
- Hilaria swallenii Cory - United States (New Mexico, Texas), Mexico (Chihuahua, Coahuila, Nuevo León, Durango, San Luis Potosí, Zacatecas)
