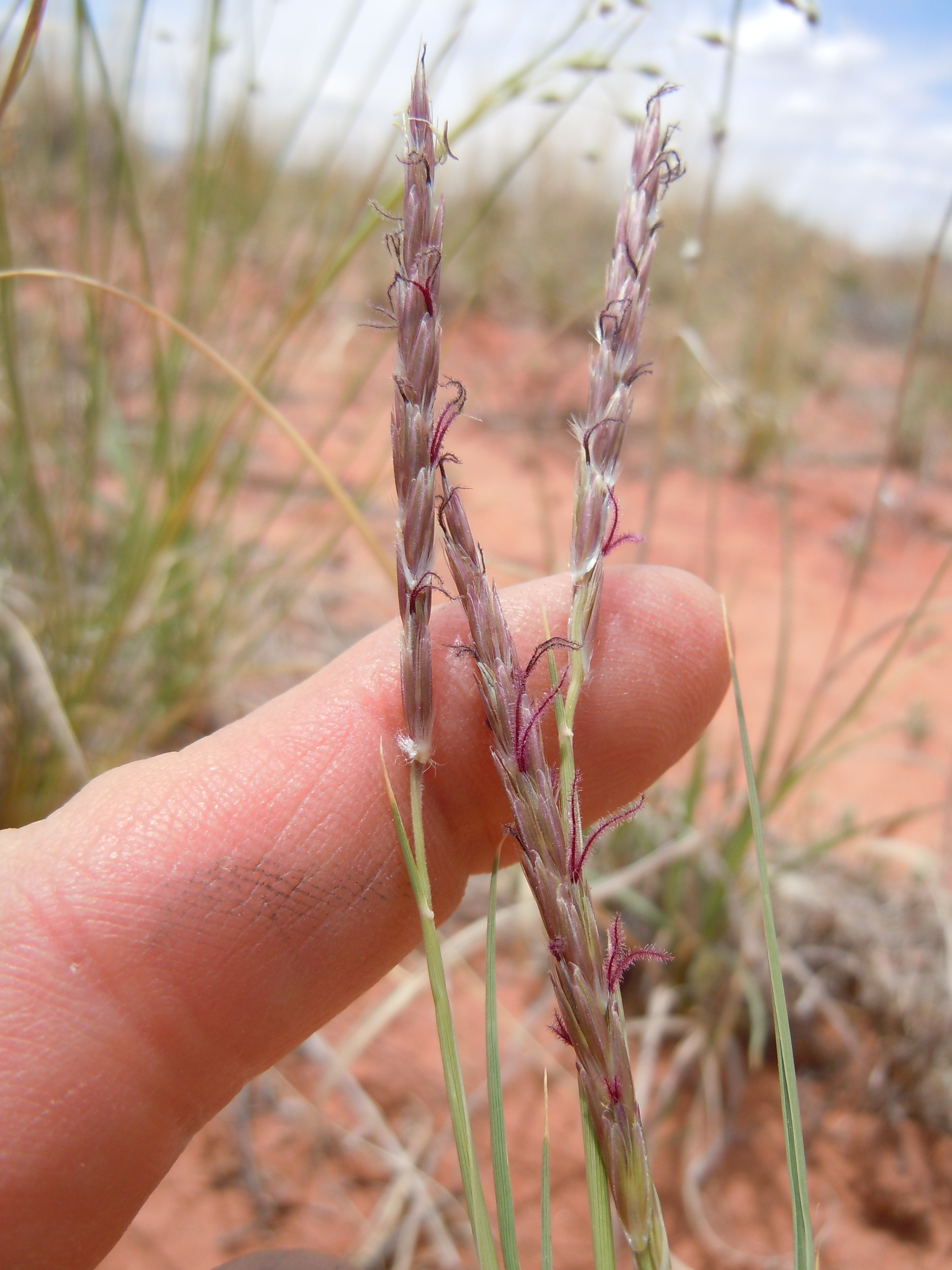

Scientific classification
- Kingdom: Plantae
- Clade: Tracheophytes
- Clade: Angiosperms
- Clade: Monocots
- Clade: Commelinids
- Order: Poales
- Family: Poaceae
- Subfamily: Chloridoideae
- Genus: Hilaria
- Species: H. jamesii

Binomial name
- Hilaria jamesii (Torr.) Benth.

Synonyms
- Pleuraphis jamesii Torr.

= Hilaria jamesii =

Species of flowering plant

Hilaria jamesii (formerly Pleuraphis jamesii) is a species of grass known by the common name James' galleta.

== Range and habitat ==
It is native to the southwestern United States, where it is widespread in scrub, woodland, grassland, and plateau habitat. It is tolerant of arid environments such as desert floors. It is common in the northern Mojave Desert.

== Growth pattern ==
It is a rhizomatous perennial grass producing bunches of erect stems about 1 mm wide and up to about 60 cm in maximum height. The woody rhizome is shallow, spreading just under the soil surface, but it may reach 6 ft in length and when dense, helps the grass form a sod. Its stems are not fuzzy like those of its relative, Hilaria rigida.

== Flowers ==
The inflorescence is a series of hairy, rectangular spikelets.

== Fruit ==
The grass produces relatively little viable seed and spreads mostly via its rhizome.
