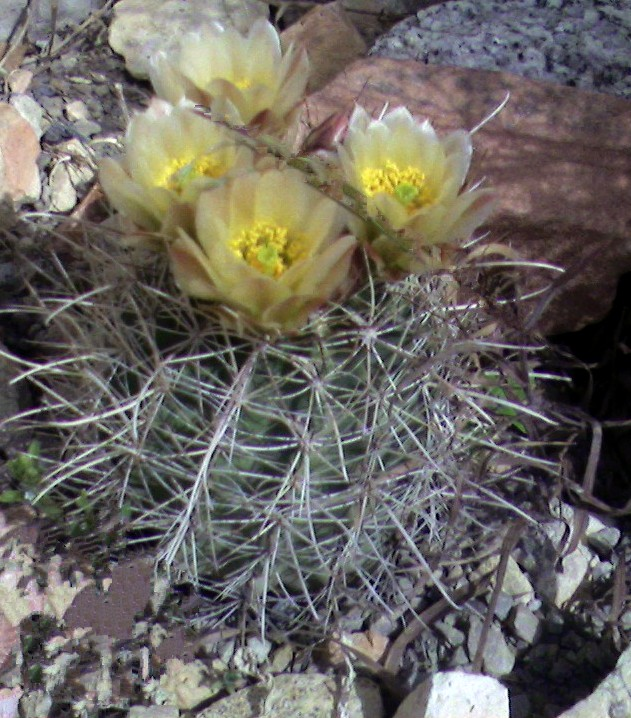
- Sclerocactus wrightiae

Scientific classification
- Kingdom: Plantae
- Clade: Tracheophytes
- Clade: Angiosperms
- Clade: Eudicots
- Order: Caryophyllales
- Family: Cactaceae
- Subfamily: Cactoideae
- Tribe: Cacteae
- Genus: Sclerocactus; Britton & Rose

Type species
- Sclerocactus polyancistrus

Species
- See text

Synonyms
- Ancistrocactus (K.Schum.) Britton & Rose; Coloradoa Boissev. ex C.Davidson; Echinomastus Britton & Rose; Papyrocactus Doweld; Roseia Frič; Toumeya Britton & Rose, nom. illeg.; Utahia Britton & Rose

= Sclerocactus =

Genus of cacti

Sclerocactus ("hard cactus", from Greek; refers to the hard, dry fruit) is a genus of cacti. It comprises about 15 species, the exact number depending on the authority. These species are xerophytic. They are sometimes called 'fishhook cactus' or 'little barrels.'

== Description ==
Sclerocactus range in shape from ovoid to elongate cylindric, have rigid stems with tubercles that are generally coalesced into ribs, and are covered with spines that come out of the areoles. Most species have at least one hooked spine at each areole. Less often, species may not have hooks.

These plants are found in higher elevation deserts such as on the Colorado Plateau, or in the Mohave Desert or the Great Basin. They are well suited to extremes due to lack of rainfall, hot summers and below freezing winters.

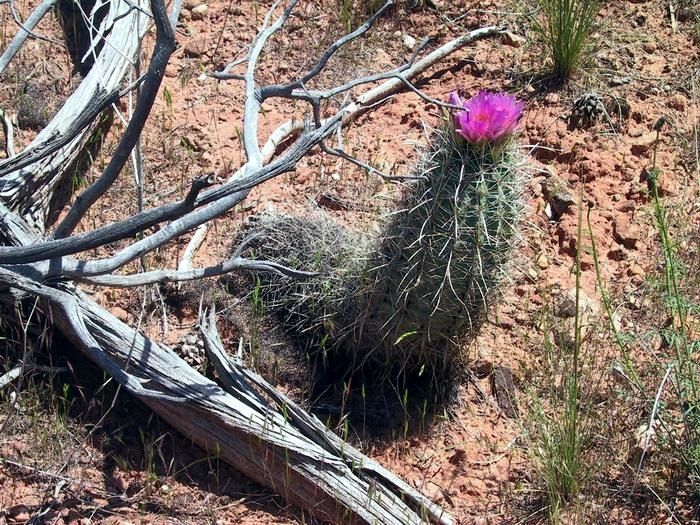
Sclerocactus. parviflorus growing on its side with wood debris nearby

The little barrel cactus typically grows in areas where water flows irregularly or depressions where water can accumulate for short periods of time. They are most often found growing along washes and arroyos where their seeds have been subjected to scarification due to water movement, but they oddly also tend to grow along ridges in spots where depressions have formed and can hold water for some period of time.

The sometimes hooked or curved spines and the armored web of spines enclosing the cactus body in species of this genus is an adaptation which allows the plant to move to more favorable locations. This plants seeds germinate in areas where water movement occurs or in areas where standing water accumulates for some period of time, and during flash floods, the hooked spines allow the plants to be caught on water borne debris and be uprooted and carried to areas where water tends to accumulate. A large percentage of plants in habitat show signs of water debris damage along the stems which has healed and are found growing on their sides in places where floodwaters have deposited them. The habitat these plants exist in is very arid, and the plants have adapted to exploit water movement to concentrate their biomass in areas where water is likely to be present.

== Synonymy ==
Sclerocactus was once reduced to synonymy with Pediocactus—but this is not accepted; these genera are not closely related. The following genera have been brought into synonymy with Sclerocactus:

- Ancistrocactus Britton & Rose
- Coloradoa Boissev. & C.Davidson
- Echinomastus Britton & Rose
- Toumeya Britton & Rose

== Species ==
As of September 2026, the following species are recognized in the genus Sclerocactus by Plants of the World Online:

Section	Image	Scientific name	Distribution
Coloradoa		Sclerocactus mesae-verdae (Boissev. & C.Davidson) L.D.Benson	SW. Colorado to NW. New Mexico.
Parviflori		Sclerocactus brevispinus K.D.Heil & J.M.Porter	NE. Utah
Parviflori		Sclerocactus cloverae K.D.Heil & J.M.Porter	S. Colorado to N. & Central New Mexico
Parviflori		Sclerocactus dawsoniae McGlaughlin & Naibauer	Colorado.
Parviflori		Sclerocactus glaucus (K.Schum.) L.D.Benson	Colorado.
Parviflori		Sclerocactus parviflorus Clover & Jotter	Utah to W. Colorado and N. Arizona.
Parviflori		Sclerocactus sileri (L.D.Benson) K.D.Heil & J.M.Porter	Arizona (NE. Coconino County)
Parviflori		Sclerocactus wetlandicus Hochstätter	NE. Utah
Parviflori		Sclerocactus whipplei (Engelm. & J.M.Bigelow) Britton & Rose	SE. Utah to NE. Arizona
Parviflori		Sclerocactus wrightiae L.D.Benson	Central Utah.
Sclerocactus		Sclerocactus blainei S.L.Welsh & K.H.Thorne	Nevada to WSW. Utah
Sclerocactus		Sclerocactus nyensis Hochstätter	Nevada (N. Mojave Desert)
Sclerocactus		Sclerocactus polyancistrus (Engelm. & J.M.Bigelow) Britton & Rose	Eastern California and Southern Nevada
Sclerocactus		Sclerocactus pubispinus (Engelm.) L.D.Benson	E. Nevada to W. Utah
Sclerocactus		Sclerocactus spinosior (Engelm.) D.Woodruff & L.D.Benson	Utah
incertae sedis		Sclerocactus brevihamatus (Engelm.) D.R.Hunt	SW. Texas to Mexico (Coahuila, Nuevo León)
incertae sedis		Sclerocactus hispidus (D.Donati & Zanov.) Lodé	Coahuila
incertae sedis		Sclerocactus intertextus (Engelm.) N.P.Taylor	E. Nevada to W. Utah
incertae sedis		Sclerocactus johnsonii (Parry ex Engelm.) N.P.Taylor	SE. California to SW. Utah and NW. Mexico
incertae sedis		Sclerocactus mariposensis (Hester) N.P.Taylor	SW. Texas to Mexico (Coahuila, Nuevo León)
incertae sedis		Sclerocactus papyracanthus (Engelm.) N.P.Taylor	E. Central Arizona to W. Texas
incertae sedis		Sclerocactus pinkavanus (García-Mor., Gonz.-Bot. & Rodr.González) M.H.J.van der Meer	Coahuila
incertae sedis		Sclerocactus scheeri (Salm-Dyck) N.P.Taylor	E. Central Arizona to W. Texas
incertae sedis		Sclerocactus tobuschii (W.T.Marshall) Lodé	SW Texas (E Edwards Plateau)
incertae sedis		Sclerocactus unguispinus (Engelm.) N.P.Taylor	NE. Mexico
incertae sedis		Sclerocactus warnockii (L.D.Benson) N.P.Taylor	W. Texas to Mexico (Chihuahua, Coahuila)

Many species of Sclerocactus are protected under the provisions of the Endangered Species Act and all species should be treated as imperiled.

== Cultivation and propagation ==
Sclerocactus are easy to cultivate. They are generally a cold-adapted genus. They grow in very arid areas which are subjected to deep cold in spots where water flows irregularly or depressions where water can accumulate for short period of time. They are most often found growing along washes and arroyos where their seeds have been subjected to scarification due to water movement, but they oddly also tend to grow along ridges in spots where depressions have formed and can hold water for some period of time.

They undergo most of their growth in spring and benefit from moderate fertilizer in cultivation. They prefer mineral-rich, sandy soils. They are tolerant of overwatering provided they are grown in small pots that drain and dry out quickly. They do best out of doors do well in full sun. They are not particularly attractive plants and their vicious hooked spines are a hazard, making them poor houseplants. Like Pediocactus, Sclerocactus "deflate" in late fall in preparation for winter and freezing; they push water out of the plant flesh, through the roots, and into the soil, dramatically decreasing in size. They require deep cold and dormancy to bloom well.

Some species, such as S. parviflorus, produce large, showy flowers and put a short, but impressive floral display in early spring.

Sclerocactus seeds are difficult to germinate as they contain inhibitors, and require cold stratification, prolonged soaking, or scarification of the seeds to trigger germination. Seeds of members of this genus can take up to three years to germinate in some cases if not scarified or subjected to repeated freeze-thaw cycles in the presence of water. The plants are easy to maintain in cultivation but difficult to start from seed.
