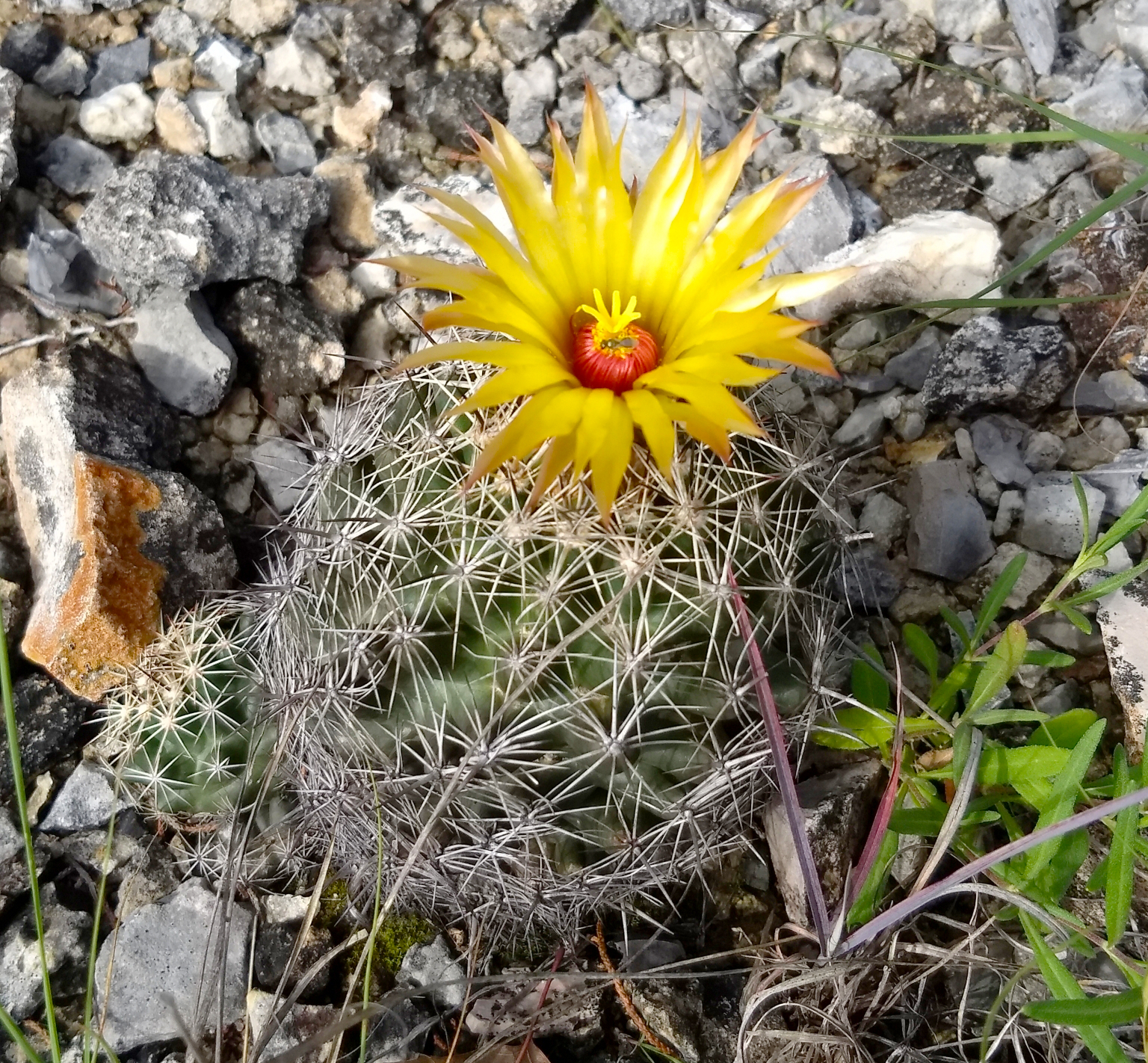

Conservation status
- Least Concern (IUCN 3.1)

Scientific classification
- Kingdom: Plantae
- Clade: Tracheophytes
- Clade: Angiosperms
- Clade: Eudicots
- Order: Caryophyllales
- Family: Cactaceae
- Subfamily: Cactoideae
- Genus: Coryphantha
- Species: C. sulcata

Binomial name
- Coryphantha sulcata (Engelm.) Britton & Rose (1923)
- Coryphantha sulcata distribution

Synonyms
- See text

= Coryphantha sulcata =

Species of cactus

Coryphantha sulcata, a member of the cactus family Cactaceae, is a species of cactus occurring in Texas and a small part of northeastern Mexico. Sometimes the species is called Grooved Nipple Cactus or Pineapple Cactus, though the latter name sometimes is shared with another species.

== Description ==
Coryphantha sulcata bodies may be either branched or unbranched, and tend to form clumps. Typical of species of the genus Coryphantha, the body surfaces are divided into conical tubercles with rounded tops, looking like closely packed, green chili pepper bottoms. Atop each tubercle arises a cluster of slender, stiff spines, from a spot called the areole.

Arising from each areole are 9–18 spines, which are yellowish or pinkish when young, but later turning gray to nearly white with dark reddish brown or black tips. These spines can be of two types: There are 0–4 "central spines" of at which at least one sticks straight up from the areole's surface, while other central spines, if present, are directed more obliquely; then there are 8–15 "radial spines" which are 9–16 mm (0.35–0.63 in) long, stout and radiating outward, keeping close to the cactus body's surface.

Flowers are 40 mm–60 mm × 35 mm–55 mm (1.6 in–2.4 in × 1.4 in–2.2 in) in size and arise at the body's apex, or nearly so. The tepals are golden yellow or rarely greenish yellow, and at their bases bright red or rarely brownish red or greenish. Stigmas are 7–10 lobed, and whitish or greenish yellow. Fruits usually start out green but become dull red and broadly egg-shaped.

== Habitat ==
In Texas Coryphantha sulcata occurs in shrublands and savannas with gravelly, sandy to clayey soils, at elevations of 300–1,100 m (980–3,610 ft).

== Distribution ==
On the iNaturalist species page for Coryphanthus sulcata, research-grade observations are documented indicating that in Texas follows the taxon occurs in a somewhat narrow band from near the Oklahoma border north of the Dallas-Fort Worth area, south-southwesterly to the Mexican border around Del Rio, and into the northeast Mexican states of Coahuila, Nuevo León and Tamaulipas

== Conservation status ==
As of July 2025, the online version of the IUCN Red List listed Coryphantha sulcata as a least concern species. That assessment was made in 2017. However, concurrently, NatureServe, with a 2005 assessment, classified Coryphantha sulcata as a "G3 Vulnerable" species, though at that time NatureServe also reported the Texas Parks and Wildlife Department as classifying the species as S-4, interpreted as "Apparently Secure in Texas." In Mexico, close to the Texas border, the species occurs in natural grasslands where natural gas is extracted and both cattle ranching and farming may be impacting the population.

== Taxonomy ==
In July, 2025, the Flora of North America said that Coryphantha sulcata probably will prove to be the same as taxa in Mexico. In terms of field identification of the species, the Flora also said that from Austin, Texas eastward, morphological features of Coryphantha sulcata converge with those of C. missouriensis, occurring in the same region. It points out that the central spines of adult C. sulcata, when present, often curve downward, unlike the straight spines of C. missouriensis.

Something similar occurs in the general region of the Pecos River in southern Texas, where C. sulcata and C. echinus approach one another geographically. Both species are variable in appearance, their appearances change with age, and each lack central spines until sexual maturity or later. Interestingly, these species are closely related, but not each other's closest relative.

=== Synonyms ===
As of 2025:

- Cactus scolymoides var. sulcatus (Engelm.) J.M.Coult. (1894)
- Cactus sulcatus (Engelm.) Small (1903)
- Coryphantha radians var. sulcata (Engelm.) Y.Itô (1952)
- Mammillaria radians var. sulcata (Engelm.) J.M.Coult. ex K.Schum. (1898)
- Mammillaria radians f. sulcata (Engelm.) Schelle (1907)
- Mammillaria sulcata Engelm. (1845)
- Cactus calcaratus Kuntze (1891)
- Cactus kotschubeyi Kuntze (1891)
- Coryphantha calcarata Lem. (1868)
- Coryphantha obscura Boed. (1930)
- Coryphantha roederiana Boed. (1929)
- Coryphantha speciosa Boed. (1930)
- Mammillaria calcarata Engelm. (1850)
- Mammillaria strobiliformis Muehlenpf. (1848)
