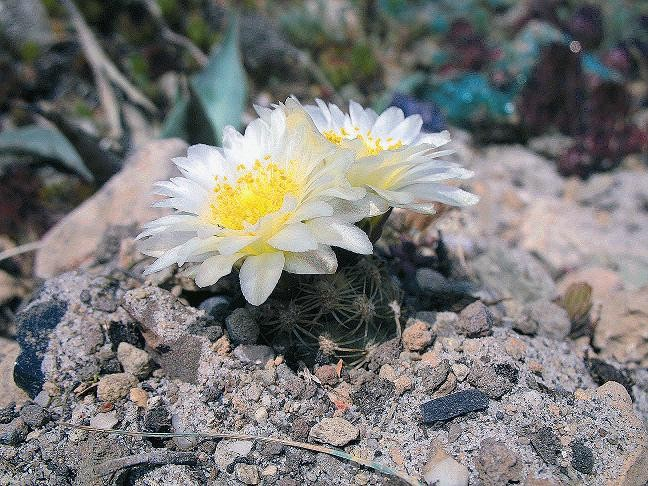

Conservation status
- Near Threatened (IUCN 2.3)
- CITES Appendix I (CITES)

Scientific classification
- Kingdom: Plantae
- Clade: Tracheophytes
- Clade: Angiosperms
- Clade: Eudicots
- Order: Caryophyllales
- Family: Cactaceae
- Subfamily: Cactoideae
- Genus: Pediocactus
- Species: P. bradyi

Binomial name
- Pediocactus bradyi L.D.Benson

Synonyms
- Pediocactus simpsonii subsp. bradyi (L.D.Benson) Halda 1998; Puebloa bradyi (L.D.Benson) Doweld 1999; Toumeya bradyi (L.D.Benson) Earle 1963

= Pediocactus bradyi =

Endangered species of cactus

Pediocactus bradyi is a very rare species of cactus known by the common names Brady's pincushion cactus, Brady's hedgehog cactus, and Marble Canyon cactus. It is endemic to Arizona in the US, where it is restricted to Marble Canyon in Coconino County, though its exact distribution is not generally advertised due to poaching concerns. It is limited to a specific type of soil, it has a small distribution, and the species is threatened by a number of human activities. This has been a federally listed endangered species of the United States since 1979.

== Description ==
This cactus is globose, tubercular, and usually solitary. It is up to about 6 centimeters tall by 5 wide. Each areole has some wool and several slightly curved yellowish to white spines up to half a centimeter long. There are occasionally one or two central spines which are darker in color. The cactus flowers in the early spring. The flower is up to roughly 2 centimeters long by 3 wide and has red or green-striped yellowish outer tepals and straw-colored inner tepals. The fruit is green ripening red-brown and about a centimeter long. The cactus shrinks and retracts under the ground during the dry season, making it very hard to find. The related cacti Pediocactus bradyi subsp. winkleri and Pediocactus bradyi subsp. despainii are included as subspecies.

== Subspecies ==
Image	Subspecies	Distribution
	Pediocactus bradyi subsp. bradyi	N. Arizona.
	Pediocactus bradyi subsp. despainii (S.L.Welsh & Goodrich) Hochstätter	Utah
	Pediocactus bradyi subsp. winkleri (K.D.Heil) Hochstätter ex D.R.Hunt	Utah

== Distribution and habitat ==
Pediocactus bradyi is native to Coconino County, Arizona, where it thrives on level hills adorned with limestone gravel at altitudes ranging from 900 to 1300 meters. The cactus grows on sandstone and shale land originating from the Moenkopi Formation, a geologic formation. This rock is covered in chips and gravel of Kaibab limestone, forming the plant's substrate. It is not found in any other soil types. It grows alongside plants such as shadscale (Atriplex confertifolia), snakeweed (Gutierrezia sarothrae), and Mormon tea (Ephedra viridis). This plant is commonly found in the company of Sclerocactus parviflorus, Navajoa peeblesiana subsp. fickeiseniorum, Echinocactus polycephalus var. xeranthemoides, Echinocereus engelmannii var. variegatus, Opuntia nicholii, Opuntia basilaris, and various Yucca species.

This plant was listed as an endangered species because of many threats, including highway construction and maintenance, off-road vehicle use, cattle grazing, and poaching. Natural threats to the species include frost heaving. The small population size limited in distribution makes it vulnerable to extinction. It is also vulnerable to the effects of climate change, especially increased droughts.
