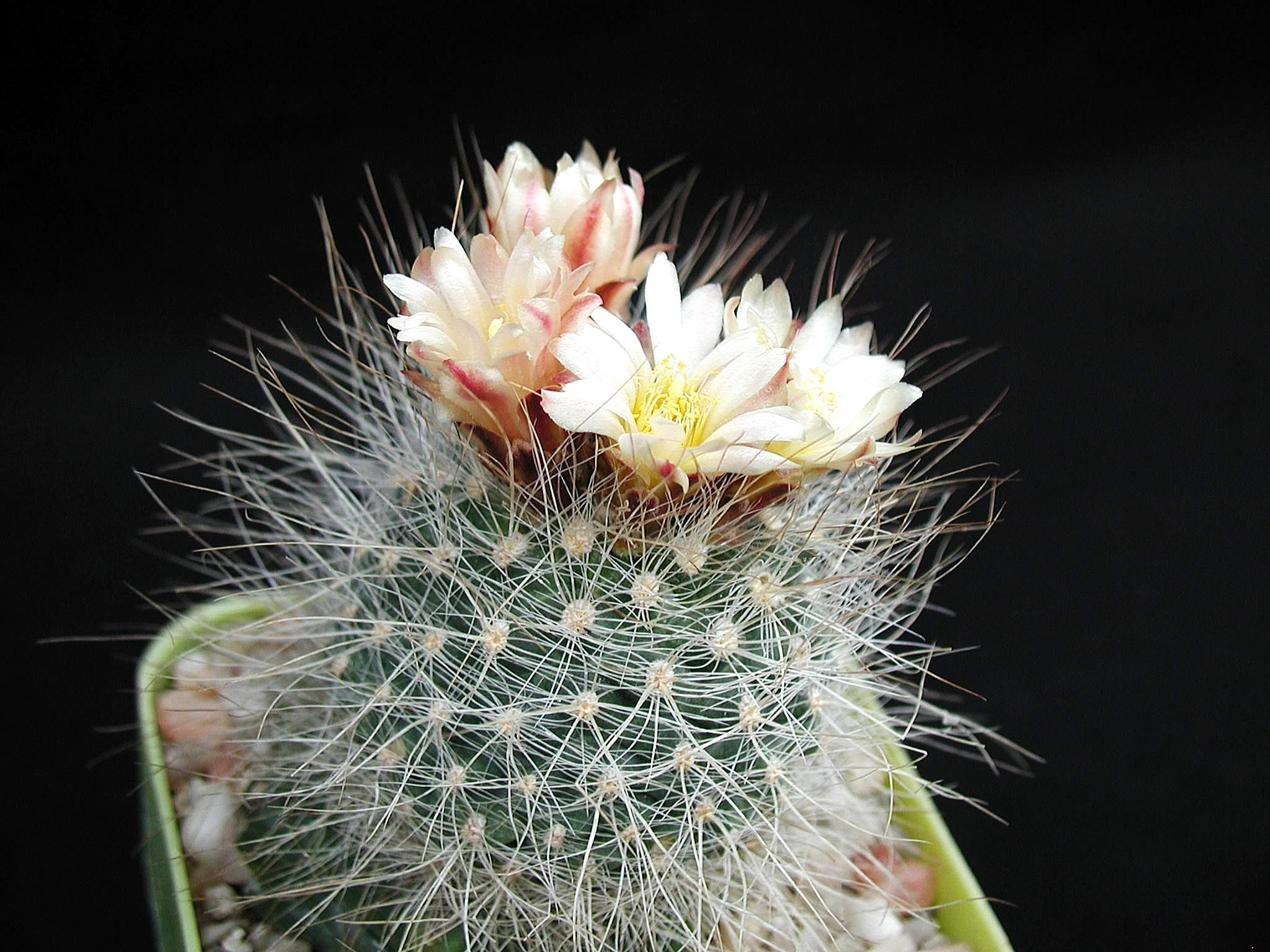

Conservation status
- Endangered (IUCN 2.3)

Scientific classification
- Kingdom: Plantae
- Clade: Tracheophytes
- Clade: Angiosperms
- Clade: Eudicots
- Order: Caryophyllales
- Family: Cactaceae
- Subfamily: Cactoideae
- Genus: Pediocactus
- Species: P. paradinei

Binomial name
- Pediocactus paradinei B.W.Benson

Synonyms
- Pediocactus simpsonii var. paradinei (B.W.Benson) Halda 1998; Pilocanthus paradinei (B.W.Benson) B.W.Benson & Backeb. 1957

= Pediocactus paradinei =

Species of cactus

Pediocactus paradinei, also known as bristly plains cactus, Houserock Valley cactus, Kaibab pincushion cactus, Paradine cactus, and Park pincushion cactus is a rare species of cactus found in Arizona.

== Description ==
Pediocactus paradinei is a round cactus that grows in a depressed manner, measuring between 3 cm to 4 cm in length and 6-8 cm in diameter. It extends half underground with a sizable 15 cm long taproot. The spines, which are flexible and hair-like, range from 1-3 cm in length and exhibit colors from white to ashy grey with yellow to brown tips. This cactus features 3 to 6 central spines and 3-22 radial spines. The yellow bell-shaped flowers of Pediocactus paradinei measure 1.5 to 2 cm in length and 2.5 cm in diameter, displaying colors ranging from pinkish beige to yellow. The flowering period occurs from late April to early May.

== Distribution ==
Endemic to the desert on the Kaibab Plateau in Houserock Valley, Coconino County, Arizona, Pediocactus paradinei is found at elevations ranging from 1600 to 2000 meters. It mainly grows in open woodland areas beneath Ponderosa pine trees, as well as in shrubland/chaparral within open pinyon-juniper woodlands and sagebrush valleys on Kaibab limestone gravels. Often found in small, scattered patches, it shares its habitat with other plant species such as Sclerocactus whipplei subsp. busekii, Escobaria missouriensis subsp. marstonii, Escobaria vivipara subsp. kaibabensis, Echinocereus engelmannii var. variegatus, Opuntia, and Yucca baccata.
