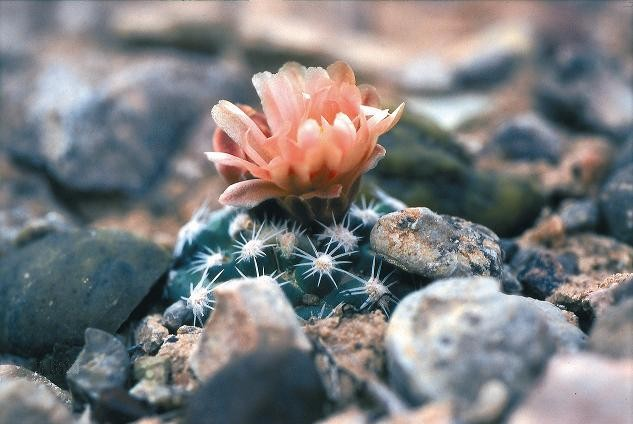

Conservation status
- Imperiled (NatureServe)

- Near Threatened (IUCN 2.3)

Scientific classification
- Kingdom: Plantae
- Clade: Tracheophytes
- Clade: Angiosperms
- Clade: Eudicots
- Order: Caryophyllales
- Family: Cactaceae
- Subfamily: Cactoideae
- Genus: Pediocactus
- Species: P. bradyi
- Subspecies: P. b. subsp. despainii

Trinomial name
- Pediocactus bradyi subsp. despainii (S.L.Welsh & Goodrich) Hochstätter

Synonyms
- Pediocactus bradyi var. despainii (S.L.Welsh & Goodrich) Hochstätter 1994; Pediocactus despainii S.L.Welsh & Goodrich 1980; Pediocactus simpsonii var. despainii (S.L.Welsh & Goodrich) Halda 1998; Puebloa bradyi var. despainii (S.L.Welsh & Goodrich) Doweld 1999

= Pediocactus bradyi subsp. despainii =

Species of cactus

Pediocactus bradyi subsp. despainii is a rare species of cactus known by the common names Despain's cactus and San Rafael cactus.

== Description ==
The stems of Pediocactus bradyi subsp. despainii have a subglobose to obovoid to turbinate shape, measuring 3.8-6 cm in diameter and 3-9.5 cm in height and generally has no branches. The roots are succulent and form clusters. It shrinks in size and disappears under the ground in dry and cold times, making it hard to find for most of the year. Circular to oval areoles, varying in color from white to brown, may be either villous or glabrate. Smooth and relatively hard radial spines, numbering 9-15 per areole, spread out and are white, measuring 2-6 mm. Older plants may rarely have a small central spine of 4-8 mm. Flowers emerge near the stem tip, measuring 1.5-2.5 × 1.8-2.5 cm. Scales and outer tepals may display toothed, entire, or undulate characteristics. Outer tepals range in color from yellow-bronze to peach-bronze or pink with purple midstripes, measuring 4-10 × 3-6 mm, while inner tepals are yellow-bronze to peach-bronze (occasionally pink) and measure 6-12 × 4-6 mm. Blooming occurs from April to May. The fruit starts green and dries to a reddish-brown, with a turbinate shape.

== Distribution ==
It is endemic to the state of Utah in the United States, where it is limited to the San Rafael Swell in Emery County, Utah at elevations of 1450 to 2080 meters.

There are two populations totaling about 6000 individuals. It is threatened by a number of human activities. It is a federally listed endangered species of the United States.

This cactus grows in the San Rafael Swell, a unique geologic feature in central Utah. It is an area with many rare native plants and has a high rate of endemism. The substrate is limestone and siltstone soil originating in the Carmel and Moenkopi Formations. The habitat is grassland with some junipers and pinyon pines.

== Taxonomy ==
This cactus was discovered in 1978 by Kim Despain and described to science in 1980. It has sometimes been treated as a subspecies or variety of Pediocactus bradyi but is not generally accepted as such. It occurs generally near to its closest relative, Pediocactus bradyi subsp. winkleri. Threats to this species include poaching, off-road vehicle use, gypsum mining, and petroleum exploration.
