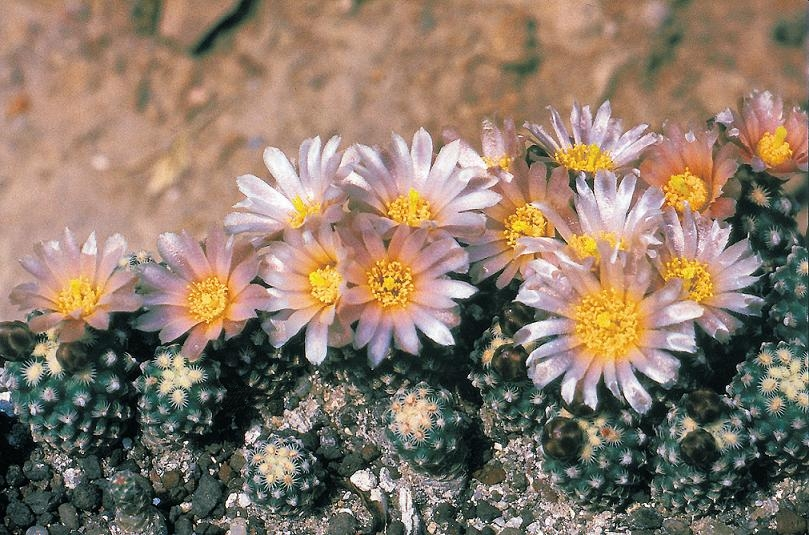

Conservation status
- Critically Endangered (IUCN 3.1)
- CITES Appendix I (CITES)

Scientific classification
- Kingdom: Plantae
- Clade: Tracheophytes
- Clade: Angiosperms
- Clade: Eudicots
- Order: Caryophyllales
- Family: Cactaceae
- Subfamily: Cactoideae
- Genus: Pediocactus
- Species: P. knowltonii

Binomial name
- Pediocactus knowltonii L.D.Benson

Synonyms
- Pediocactus bradyi var. knowltonii (L.D.Benson) Backeb. 1963; Pediocactus simpsonii var. knowltonii (L.D.Benson) Halda 1998

= Pediocactus knowltonii =

Species of cactus

Pediocactus knowltonii is a rare species of cactus known by the common names Knowlton's miniature cactus, Knowlton's pincushion cactus, and Knowlton's minute cactus.

== Description ==
A tiny cactus, it may reach a maximum size of 55 millimeters tall by 30 mm wide. It is often smaller, growing to the size of a US penny. An individual is considered to be an adult when it exceeds 10 mm in diameter. It is spherical or somewhat cylindrical in shape. The areoles are round and covered in hairs. Each areole has up to 26 radial spines which are red, pink, or white in color. The spines are less than 2 mm long. The plant produces a flower up to 35 mm long by 25 mm wide with pinkish tepals, the outer ones sporting brownish midstripes. The fruit is green, ripening reddish, and measures about 4 mm long. According to a genetic analysis, this species probably evolved as a mutation of the larger Pediocactus simpsonii.

== Distribution and habitat ==
It is endemic to San Juan County, New Mexico in the United States, where there is a single population on a patch of territory measuring about 12 acres (49,000 m^{2}). As of 2008, there are approximately 6100 individuals in this population. The cactus occurs on land very close to the Colorado border; in fact, it has been observed within 30 meters (100 ft) of the state border, but it does not technically occur within the state of Colorado, and is thus an endemic of New Mexico. Its habitat is pinyon-juniper woodland and sagebrush with loamy, gravelly alluvial soils. In some areas the substrate is covered in cobbles. The cactus may grow in the open or in the shade of larger plants.

== Conservation ==
It is the smallest and rarest species in the genus Pediocactus. It is threatened by a number of human activities, and is considered Critically Imperiled by NatureServe. It is federally listed as an endangered species of the United States. The population is partly fenced and protected by The Nature Conservancy.

=== Threats ===
The plant was discovered in 1958. It was immediately sought by collectors of cacti and within 20 years the population had been severely reduced. There may have been 100,000 individuals around the time it was discovered, and this number had been reduced to about 1000 by 1978. It is still a desirable specimen for cactus collectors because of its tiny size and rarity. The seed is available via the internet for about $10 per 100 seeds.

Other threats include off-road vehicle use and development near the population, as well as petroleum exploration activities (which are common in the area), livestock grazing, and drought. Additionally, rodents (especially deer mice) eagerly consume the fruits, causing seed production to be low.
