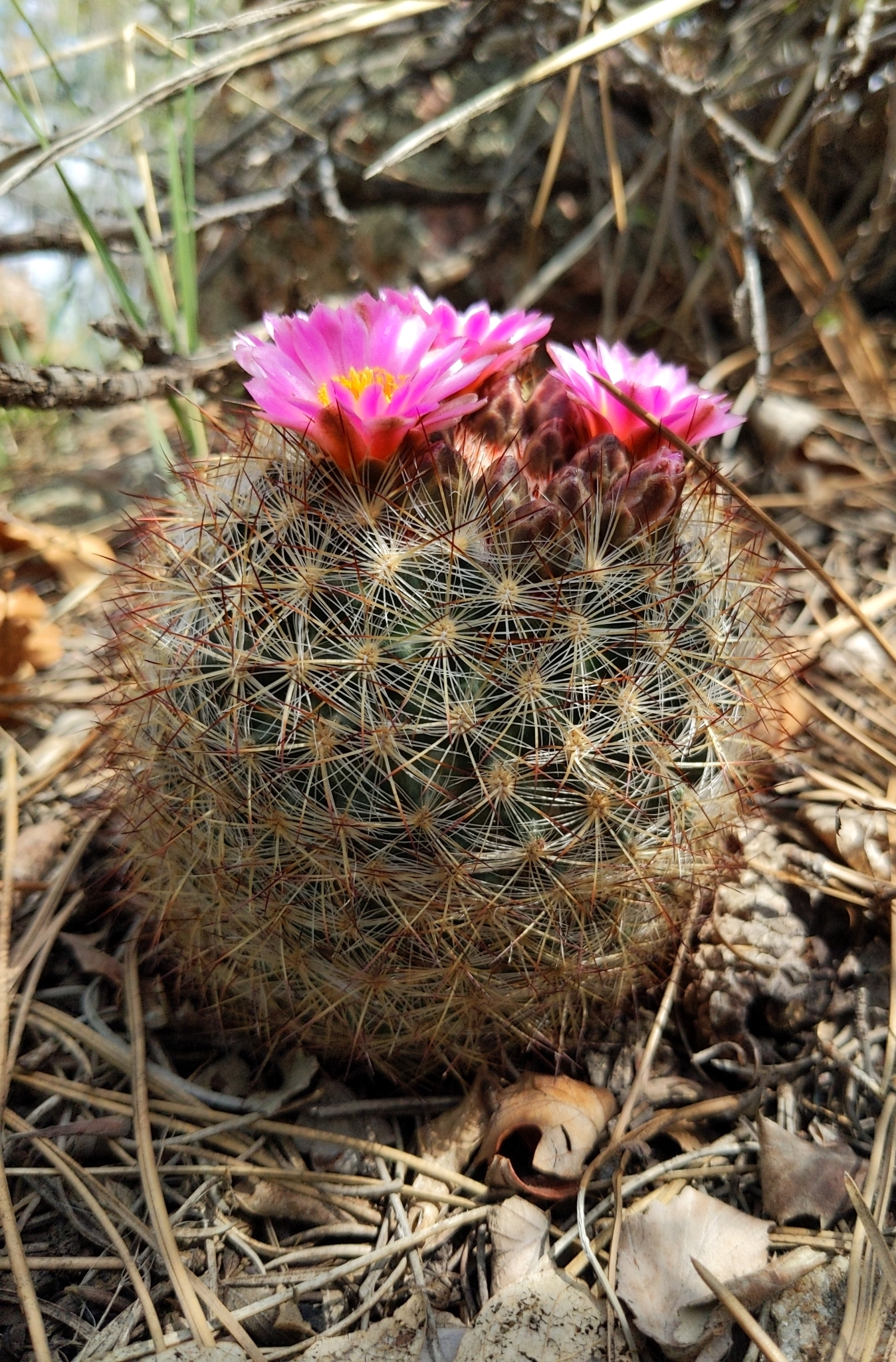
- Pediocactus simpsonii blooming Mount Falcon Park, Jefferson County, Colorado

Conservation status
- Secure (NatureServe)

Scientific classification
- Kingdom: Plantae
- Clade: Tracheophytes
- Clade: Angiosperms
- Clade: Eudicots
- Order: Caryophyllales
- Family: Cactaceae
- Subfamily: Cactoideae
- Genus: Pediocactus
- Species: P. simpsonii

Binomial name
- Pediocactus simpsonii (Engelm.) Britton & Rose

Synonyms
- List: Echinocactus simpsonii Engelm. (1863); Echinocactus simpsonii f. minor (Engelm.) Schelle (1907); Echinocactus simpsonii var. minor Engelm. (1863); Echinocactus simpsonii var. robustior J.M.Coult. (1896); Mammillaria purpusii K.Schum. (1894); Mammillaria simpsonii (Engelm.) M.E.Jones (1893); Mammillaria spaethiana Späth (1895); Pediocactus hermannii W.T.Marshall (1954); Pediocactus nigrispinus subsp. indranus (Hochstätter) Hochstätter (2003); Pediocactus robustior (J.M.Coult.) Arp (1972); Pediocactus simpsonii f. acklinii Hochstätter (1997); Pediocactus simpsonii subsp. bensonii Hochstätter (1995); Pediocactus simpsonii var. caespiticus Backeb. (1961); Pediocactus simpsonii f. campestris Hochstätter (1997); Pediocactus simpsonii f. dinosauriensis Hochstätter (1997); Pediocactus simpsonii f. flaminggorgensis Hochstätter (1997); Pediocactus simpsonii f. flinspachii Hochstätter (1997); Pediocactus simpsonii var. hermannii (W.T.Marshall) W.T.Marshall (1957); Pediocactus simpsonii subsp. idahoensis Hochstätter (1997); Pediocactus simpsonii subsp. indranus (Hochstätter) Hochstätter (1995); Pediocactus simpsonii var. indranus Hochstätter (1990); Pediocactus simpsonii f. kuenzleri Hochstätter (1997); Pediocactus simpsonii var. minor (Engelm.) Cockerell (1918); Pediocactus simpsonii f. montanensis Hochstätter (1997); Pediocactus simpsonii f. muehlii Hochstätter (1997); Pediocactus simpsonii f. prairie Hochstätter (1995); Pediocactus simpsonii subsp. robustior (J.M.Coult.) Hochstätter (1995); Pediocactus simpsonii f. sandiamontanus Hochstätter (1997)

= Pediocactus simpsonii =

Species of flowering plant in the family

Pediocactus simpsonii, known by the common names mountain cactus, snowball cactus, and mountain ball cactus, is a relatively common cactus that has adapted to survive in cold and dry environments in high elevation areas of the western United States. It can be found at higher elevations than any other cactus in North America. While not a landscape dominating plant, it is a relatively common species and the most common member of the genus Pediocactus. Because of its beauty and adaptation to cold environments it is sometimes grown by gardeners in areas that have few other choices due to the limited number of cactuses with cold adaptations. Like many cactuses its populations are sometimes threatened by this desirability due to the theft or removal of plants from the wild by collectors.

== Description ==
The body of this succulent plant is one or more enlarged rounded stems, 2.5–15 centimeters wide and 2.5–25 centimeters tall, though it usually is less than 15 centimeters in height. The shape of this stem is like an egg with the wider part towards the soil (ovoid) or like a ball shape (globose), but can be flattened out or sunken into the ground in appearance (depressed), particularly in winter. The surface of the plant is covered in pyramid shaped projections or branch-lets called tubercles. At the tip of each tubercle a round to oval structure 3 millimeters across called an areole. It is covered in fine hairs (villous) and is where the cluster of spines grow. The spines are quite hard and smooth and vary in color and size by position. The spines at the center of the cluster number 4 to 11, are 5–21 millimeters long, and are a dark color such as reddish-brown or even black at the ends with a cream to yellow colored base. The spines arrayed around the center (radial) number 12 to 35 per cluster, are 3–13 millimeters long, and are white in color.

=== Flowering and fruit ===
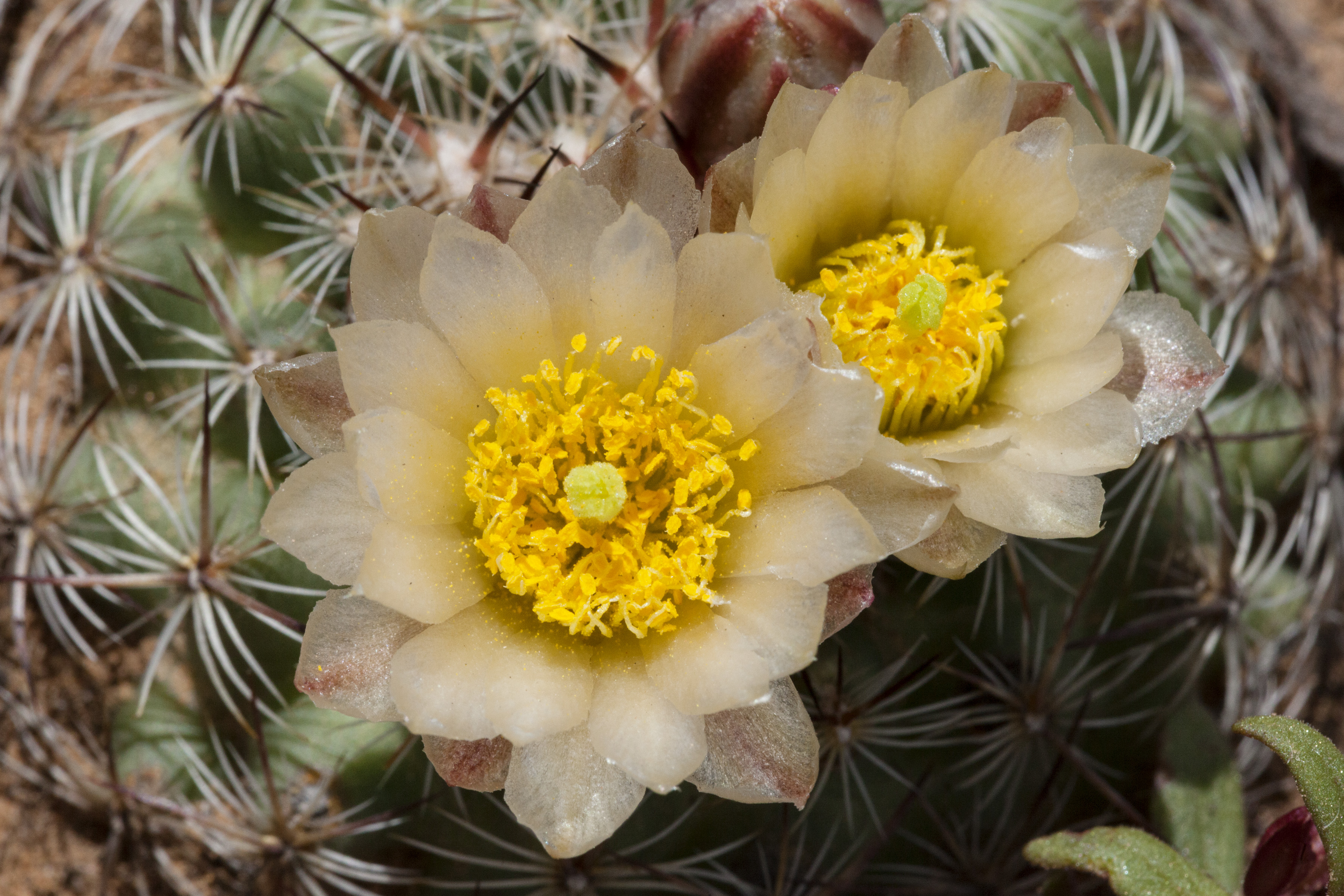
Pediocactus simpsonii pale yellow flower form near Unaweep Canyon, Mesa County, Colorado

Pediocactus simpsonii has its flowers are grouped at the center-top of the stem and are surrounded by brown or white woolly hairs. The flower buds are blunt shaped. The flowers are fragrant highly variable in color, the colored inner tepals (casually called petals) coming in white, pink, magenta, yellow, or yellow-green. The size of the flowers of Pediocactus simpsonii ranges from 1.2–3 centimeters across and 1–2.5 centimeters in depth. On cloudy days and at night the flowers will usually remain partially closed. The inner tepals are 12–25 millimeters long and 4.5–9 millimeters wide.

The scales and outer tepals of the flowers and buds have toothed edges, and may either have no deeper divisions (entire margin) or have a deep lobes like a pitchfork (laciniate), and generally have a wavy edge (undulate). The outer tepals have a greenish brown stripe down the middle and have a shape like rounded rectangle but with a tapered base (oblong-cuneate). They are 9–20 millimeters long and 3–6 millimeters wide.

The center of the flower is filled with numerous pollen bearing filaments (stamens) that are golden yellow and 6–9 millimeters long. The style and stigma-lobes are yellowish. The stamens are sensitive to touch and will move inward to clasp the style if stroked. Flowering is from spring through early summer, May to June in Colorado.

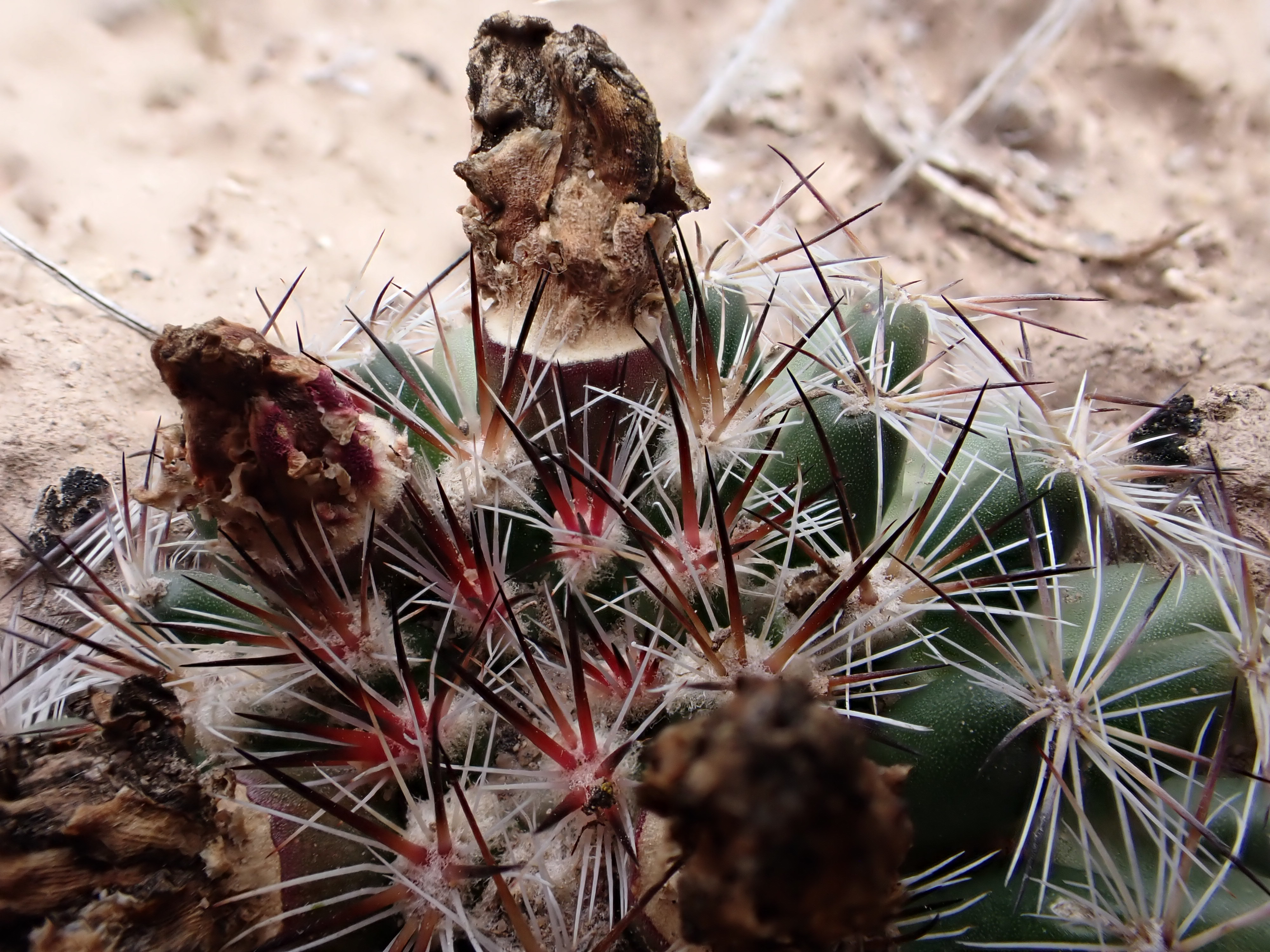
Pediocactus simpsonii with fruits and withered flowers

The fruit of Pediocactus simpsonii is a small rounded cylinder 6–11 millimeters long and 4.5–10 millimeters in diameter. The fruits are smooth, green tinged with red and filled with gray or black seeds. Its seeds are 2–3 millimeters by 1.5–2 millimeters. When ripe the fruit dries out and splits open to release the seeds.

When not in flower this species is very difficult to distinguish from other species of cactus, such as Pelecyphora vivipara (beehive cactus) another high elevation cactus. Pelecyphora vivipara has narrower tepals on its flowers and they have a fringed edge in contrast to the smooth edges of Pediocactus simpsonii's tepals. Additionally the flowers of P. simpsonii grow from near the tip of the tubricals instead of near the base, and lack the groove on one side of the tubrical. The hinged top of the ripe fruit of P. simpsonii is quite distinguishing, when present. Young plants are also easily confused with Pediocactus knowltonii, but older plants with the dark central spines are quite distinct.

== Taxonomy ==
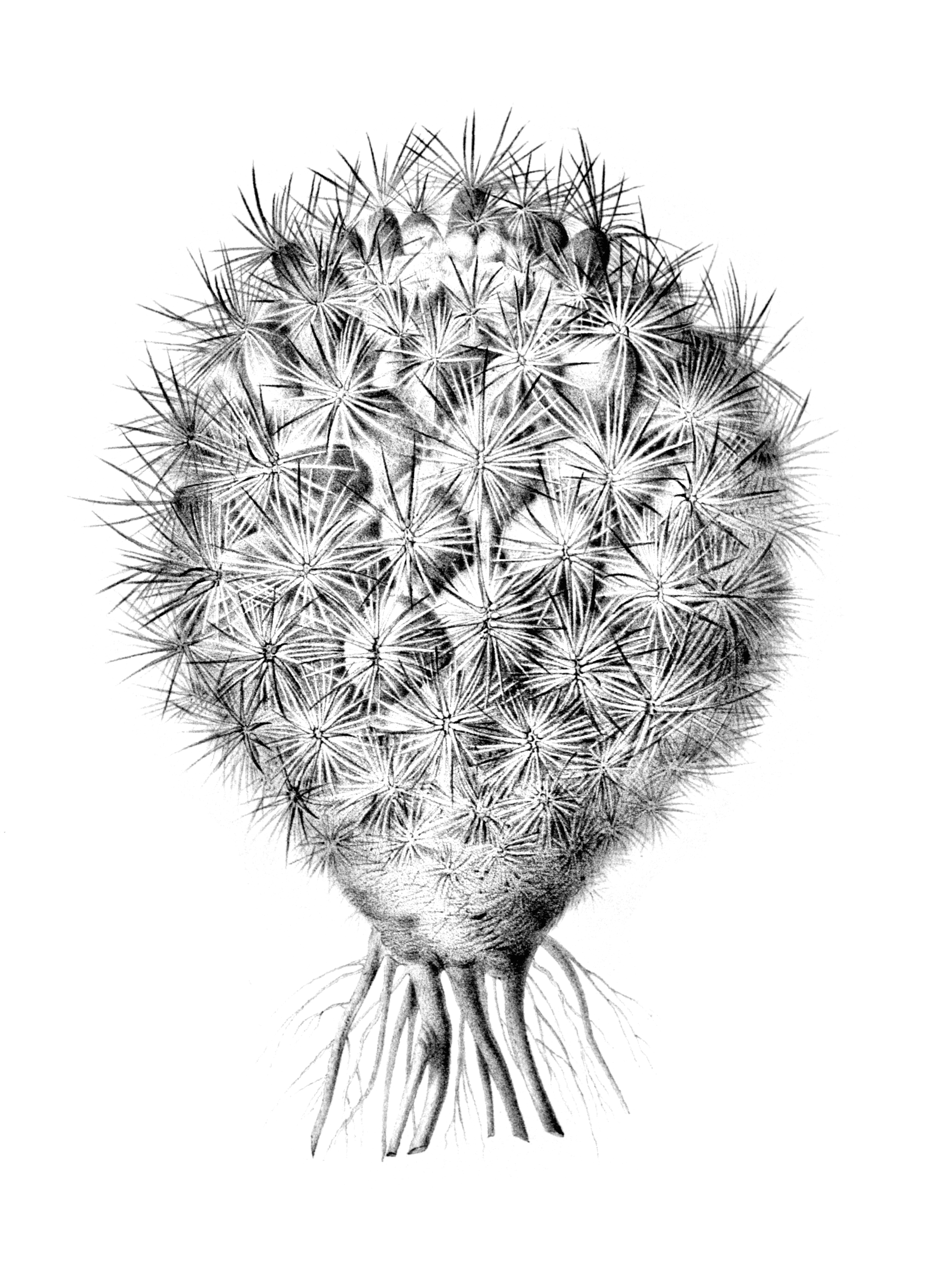
Pediocactus simpsonii illustrated

Pediocactus simpsonii was scientifically described by George Engelmann and originally given the name Echinocactus simpsonii in 1863. The species was described from specimens collected in Utah's Butte Valley and the Kobe Valley to the west. In 1893 the botanist Marcus E. Jones published a paper moving the species to genus Mammillaria, though this did not become a standard name. The name that it is most commonly classified under as of 2023, Pediocactus simpsonii, was published by American botanists Nathaniel Lord Britton and Joseph Nelson Rose in 1913. Though this name has been well accepted since that time, 21 species or subspecies have been published that are now regarded as taxonomic synonyms of P. simpsonii, including 16 described by Fritz Hochstätter in the 1990s and 2000s.

The genus Pediocactus is small, consisting of just seven to nine species. Of these, only Pediocactus simpsonii is widespread or common. It is also quite variable in form and bloom leading some botanists to recognize many subspecies or to confuse it with other cactuses.

=== Names ===
The species was named by Engelmann in honor of James H. Simpson, who was a surveyor and commander of the expedition to Utah in 1858–1859 where the first specimens were collected. The genus name, Pediocactus, comes from Greek "pedion" for "a plain", which was thought to be the habitat of the genus. Common names for Pediocactus simpsonii related to its habitat include "mountain cactus", "snowball cactus", and "mountain ball cactus". Because its range extends onto the plains it is also occasionally as the "plains cactus". Based on its scientific name it is also called "Simpson's hedgehog cactus", "Simpson's footcactus", and "Simpson's ball cactus". More generically it is called "pincushion cactus" and "hedgehog cactus", as are a number of other species.

== Distribution and conservation ==
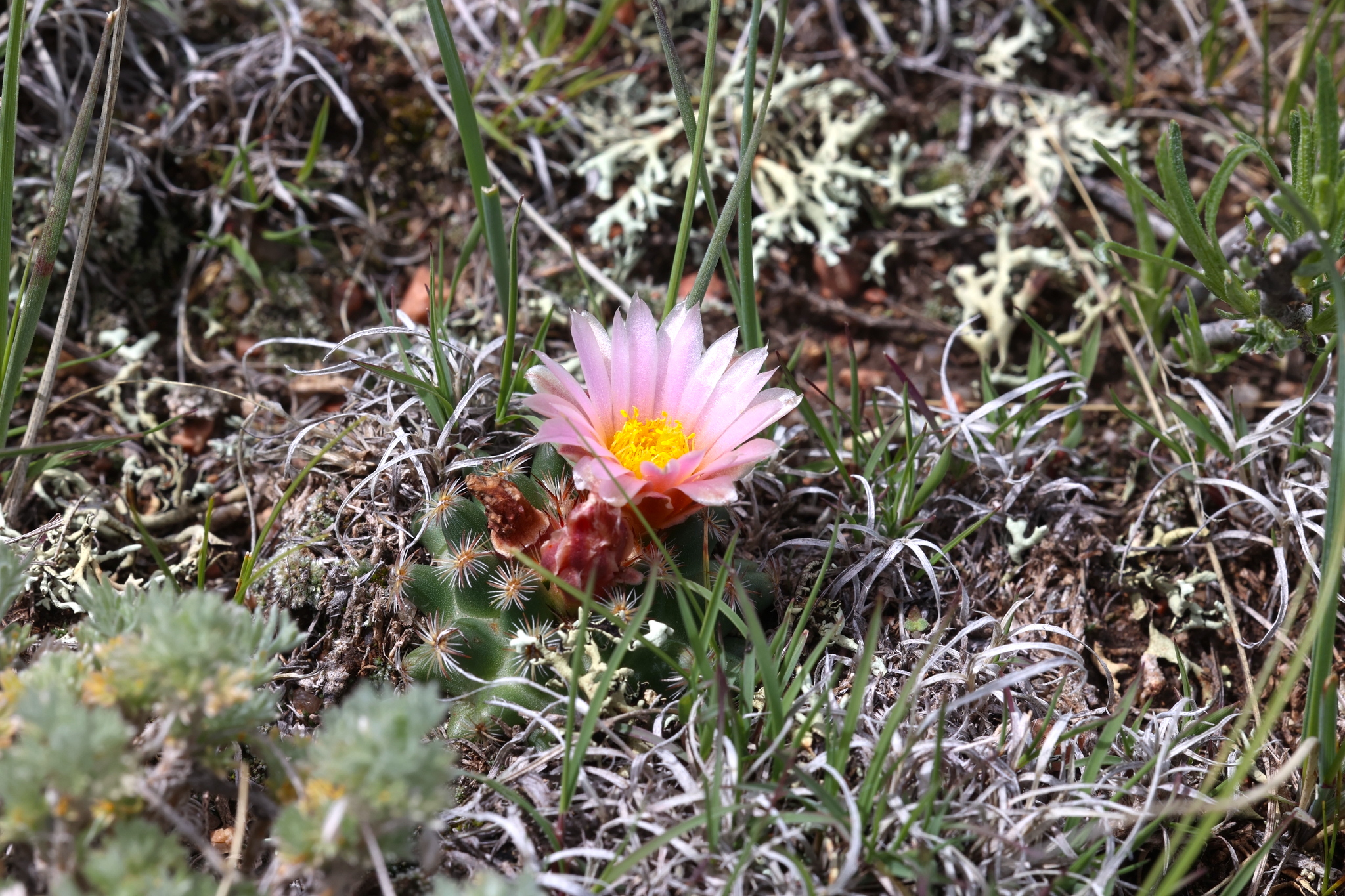
Very short, nearly flat Pediocactus simpsonii blooming in Teller County, Colorado

Pediocactus simpsonii is found throughout the interior western United States from Arizona and New Mexico in the south to Idaho and Montana in the north. It can also be found in Nevada, Utah, Wyoming, Colorado, and South Dakota. In Montana it is only found in the mountains in the southwest of the state near to the border with Idaho. It if found throughout much of the southern, non-panhandle, portions of Idaho, excluding only the western edge. In Wyoming it grows in the southern and the western sides of the state. In Nevada it is found in the mountain ranges of the Great Basin in the eastern side of the state. Utah's populations can be found through much of the state where suitable habitat is found. In Colorado it grows in the foothills, mountains, and west slope of the state. It is found only in a few isolated populations in northern Arizona and is likewise found only in the mountains of northern New Mexico.

In 2013 NatureServe evaluated the species and found it to be globally secure, G5. At the state level they evaluated it as apparently secure (S4) in three states, Montana, Nevada, and Utah. In three other states, Idaho, New Mexico, and Wyoming it was evaluated as vulnerable (S3). They found it to be critically imperiled (S1) in Arizona and have not evaluated its status in Colorado or South Dakota. The largest threat to the species is collection of plants by gardeners and for the plant trade. In some places it is as threaten by mining or development.

== Habitat ==
As many of its common names suggest, Pediocactus simpsonii mainly grows in mountains and other uplands. Within these areas it grows on dry ground and on slopes. It is found in association with ponderosa pine forests, pinyon-juniper woodlands, cool sagebrush steppes, growing under scrub oaks, and parts of the shortgrass prairie. It will also grow on bare rock outcrops, such as granite in Wyoming and sandstone outcrops in Colorado. It is very hardy for a cactus, one mountain valley where it grows successfully has recorded a low temperature of -47 °C. The elevation range for the species is from 1400 to 3500 meters. In New Mexico it is very rarely found below 1800 meters. It grows at higher elevations than any other cactus in North America. Average precipitation in its habitat is 25–30 centimeters a year, but may be as much as 50 centimeters.

It is unclear if the species is extirpated by wildfires, though it has been observed colonizing a very small number of plots after low or medium intensity wildfires and being absent from another after a medium intensity fire. The seeds of P. simpsonii on the plains of Colorado have an elaiosome and are thought to be dispersed by ants.

== Cultivation ==
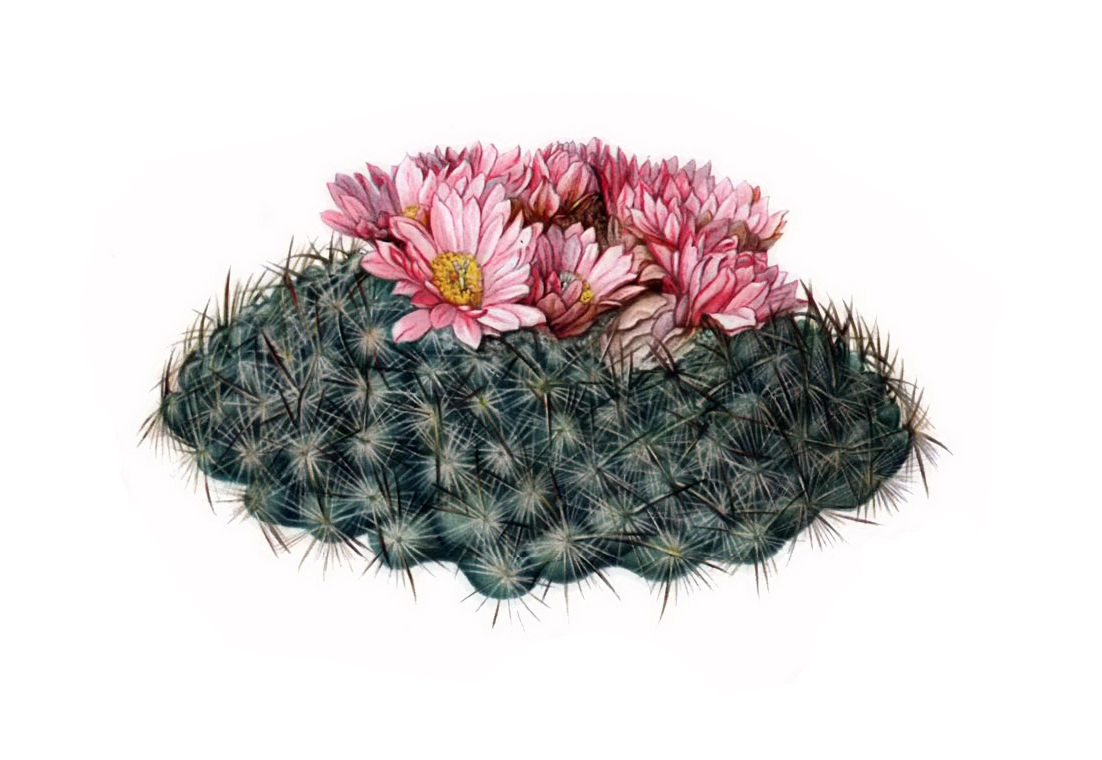
Pediocactus simpsonii illustrated by Mary Emily Eaton in 1922

The attractiveness of the "beautiful flowers" is noted even botanical texts and so mountain cactus is a plant desired by gardeners for use in rock gardens in cold climates. When grown in a garden setting the mountain cactus requires a loose soil that will not set too hard when it dries. Plants survive well with a growing medium that is two-thirds sand and one-third rotted leaves, with a layer of pure sand around the base of the plant. Rotting may occur if water remains around the plant. Flowering is reduced if mountain cactuses are not kept dry and cool during the winter season. Though very hardy in cold climates, these cactuses will die if transplanted to a hot desert climate.

Germination studies on mountain cactus seeds indicate some need of cold-moist stratification. Only 10% of seeds germinated at 21 °C after eight weeks where on the other hand 67% germinated at 4.5 °C in 17 days. Further tests found that the growth hormone gibberellic acid (GA3) would stimulate 70% germination of seeds that had been stored for several months when planted at 21 °C and even a sample that had been stored for around two years would sprout at 33% when treated with GA3. In contrast seeds stored for several months and planted at 4.5 °C and then raised to 21 °C only showed an 18% germination rate in 2–10 weeks.

== Gallery ==
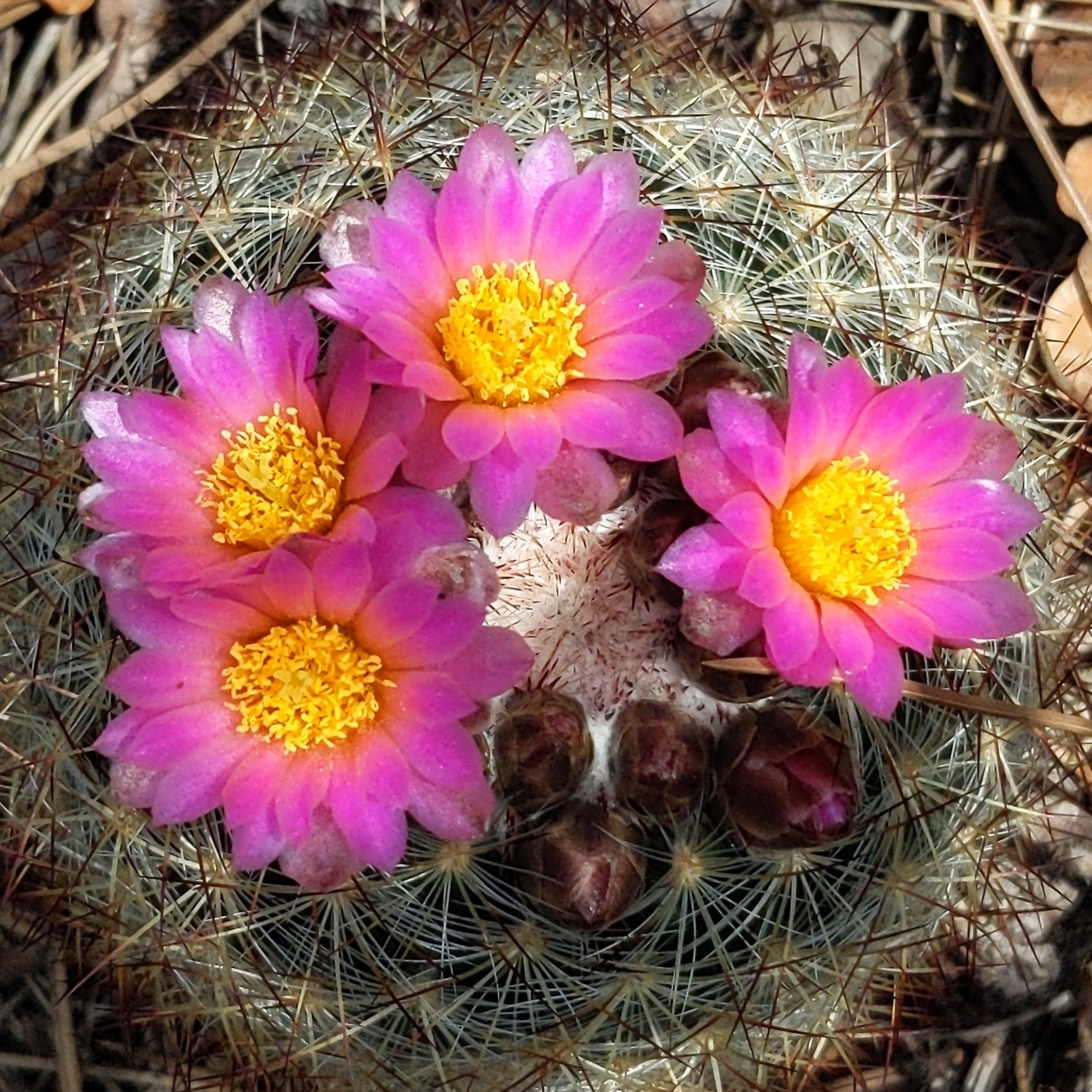
Magenta flower form

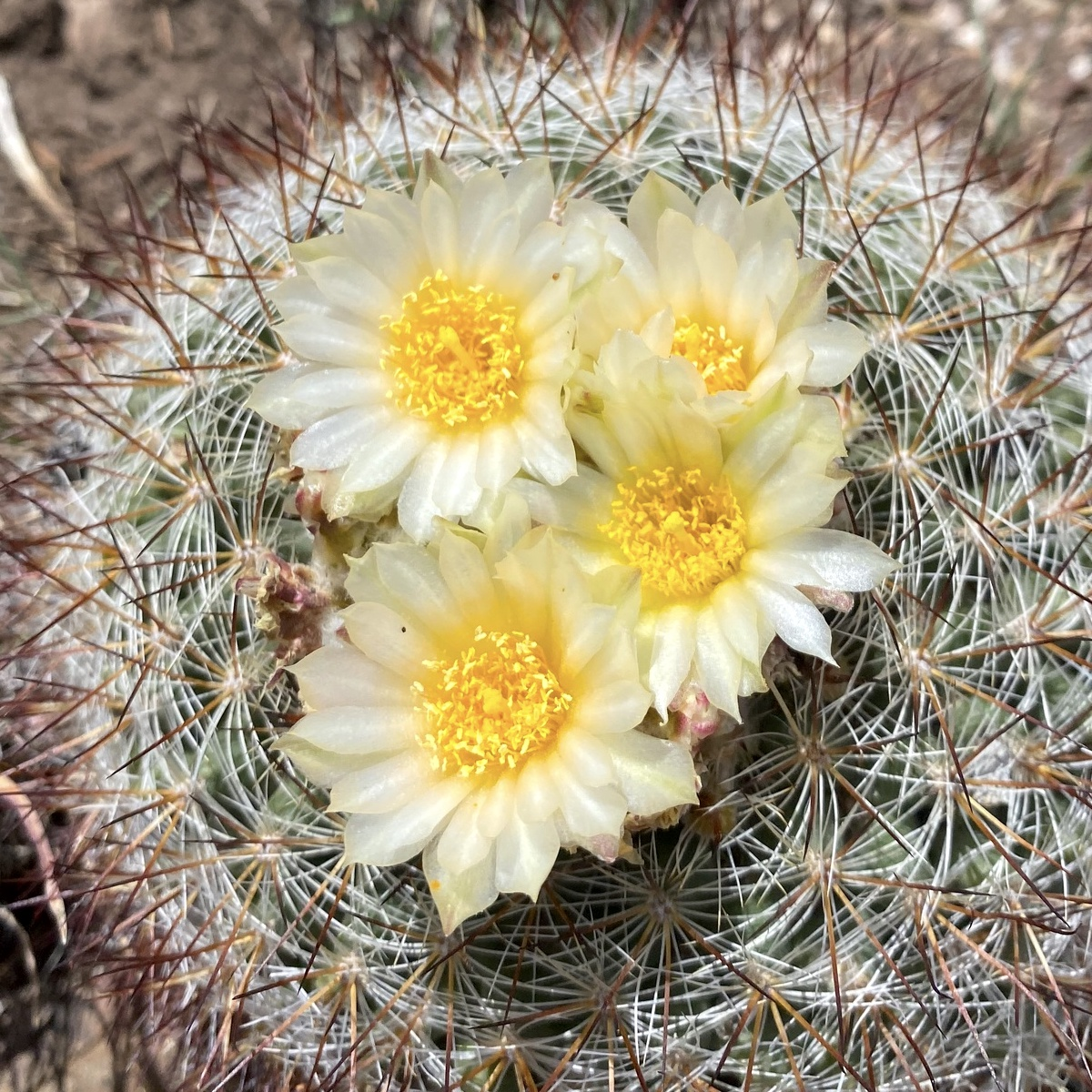
Yellow flower form

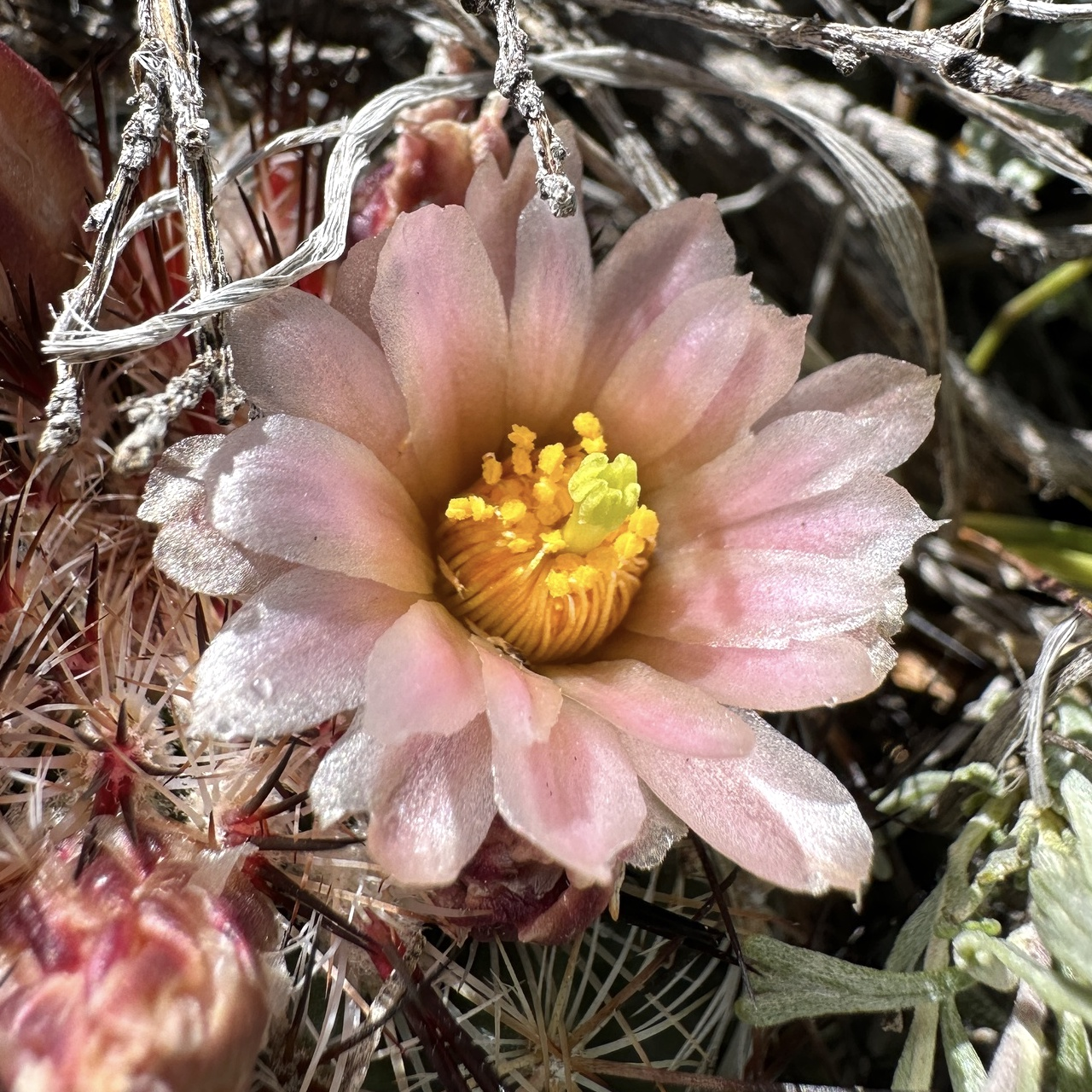
Pale pink flower form

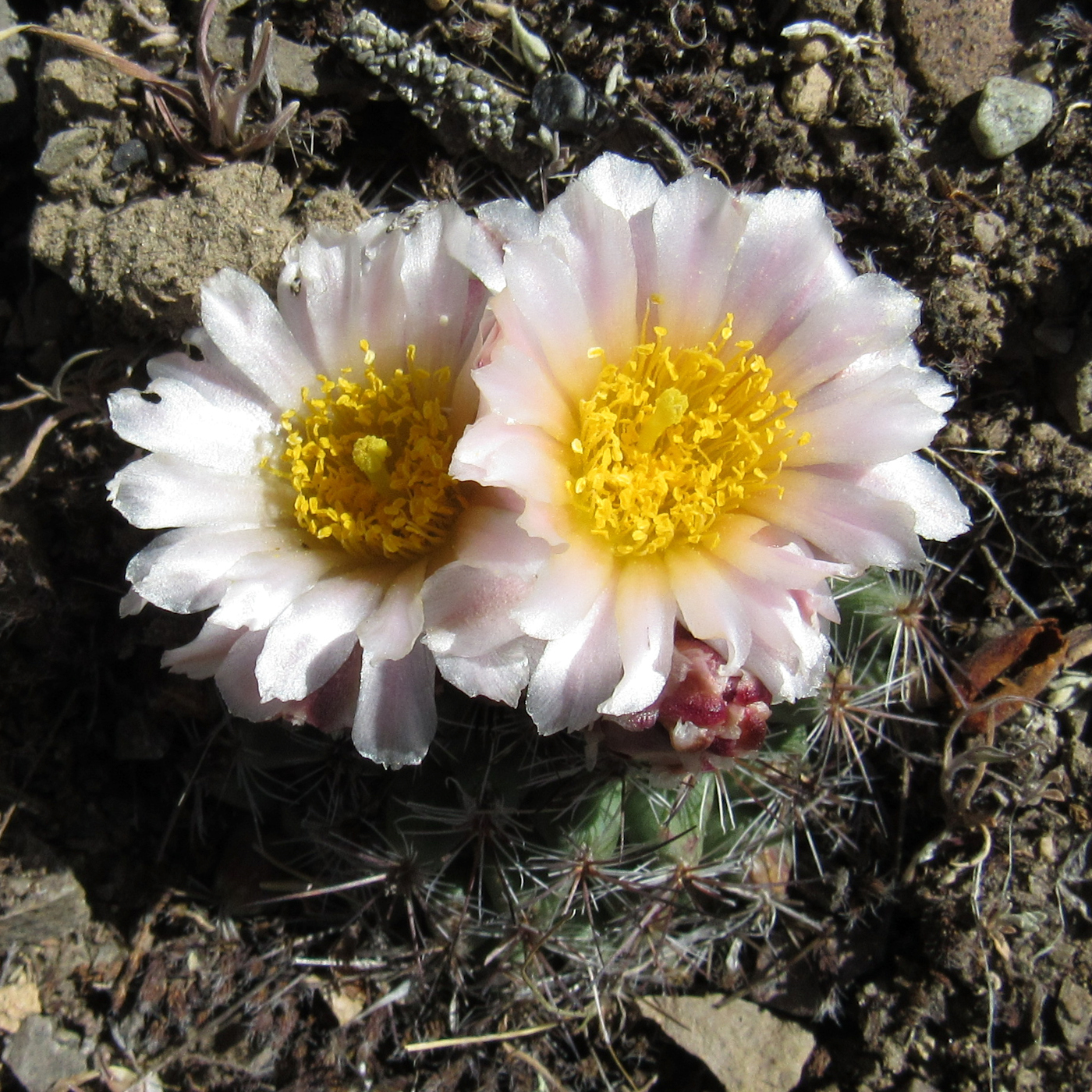
Nearly white flower form
