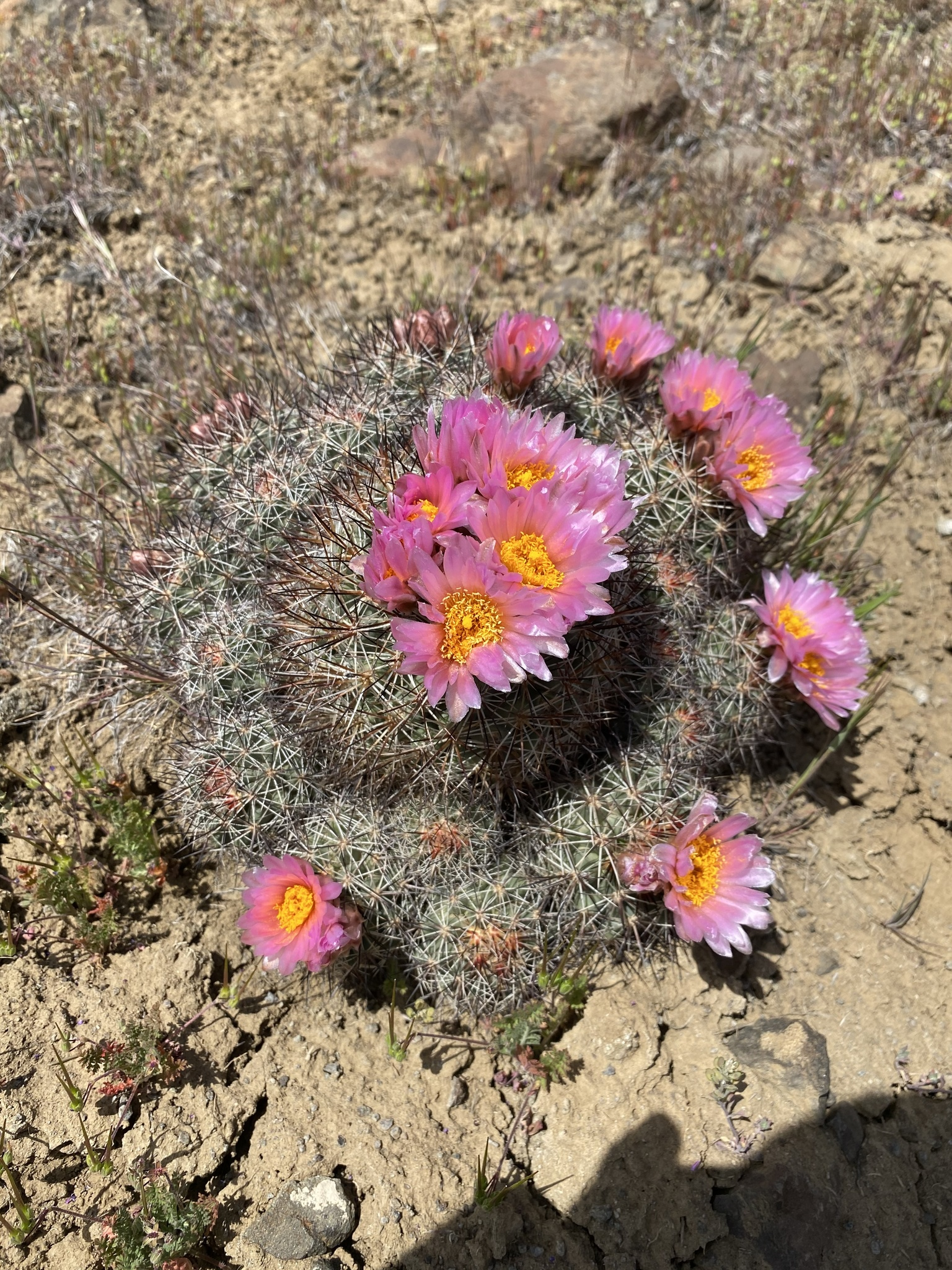

Conservation status
- Least Concern (IUCN 3.1)

Scientific classification
- Kingdom: Plantae
- Clade: Tracheophytes
- Clade: Angiosperms
- Clade: Eudicots
- Order: Caryophyllales
- Family: Cactaceae
- Subfamily: Cactoideae
- Genus: Pediocactus
- Species: P. nigrispinus

Binomial name
- Pediocactus nigrispinus (Hochstätter) Hochstätter

Synonyms
- Pediocactus simpsonii var. nigrispinus Hochstätter 1990; Pediocactus nigrispinus subsp. beastonii (Hochstätter) Hochstätter 1995; Pediocactus nigrispinus var. beastonii Hochstätter 1992; Pediocactus nigrispinus subsp. puebloensis Hochstätter 1995

= Pediocactus nigrispinus =

Species of cactus

Pediocactus nigrispinus is a species in the cactus family with the common names snowball cactus, Columbia Plateau cactus, and basalt cactus. It is found in dry areas in Washington, Oregon, and Idaho. Proposals have tried to make it the Official State Cactus for Washington State.

== Description ==
Initially spherical, the plant transforms into an egg-shaped configuration as it matures into a densely spiny (often flattened) ovoid form. It grows to 25 centimetres (10 in) tall and from 5 to 15 cm (2 to 6 in) wide. It usually develops into a cluster of ribbed stems, which are 7.5–12.5 cm (3–5 in) wide and green to grayish-blue.

There is a characteristic dense arrangement of 4 to 11 large central spines, measuring 1.5 to 2.5 cm (1/2 to 1 in) long and yellowish to reddish-brown. There are 15–35 smaller, whitish spines up to 1.5 cm long.

The showy pink to magenta flowers appear in the spring and form a cluster near the apex of each stem.

== Taxonomy ==
It was described in 1992 by Fritz Hochstätter, who named it after its black spines.

== Distribution and habitat ==
The Columbia Plateau cactus grows in big sagebrush and lower montane dry habitats in eastern Washington and Oregon and extending into Idaho in dry regions, steppes and semi-deserts on hills or rocky outcrops at altitudes between 260 and 1,200 metres (850 and 3,940 ft). It grows in scattered locations but is often locally abundant. Other plants in the habitat include Opuntia polyacantha and O. fragilis.

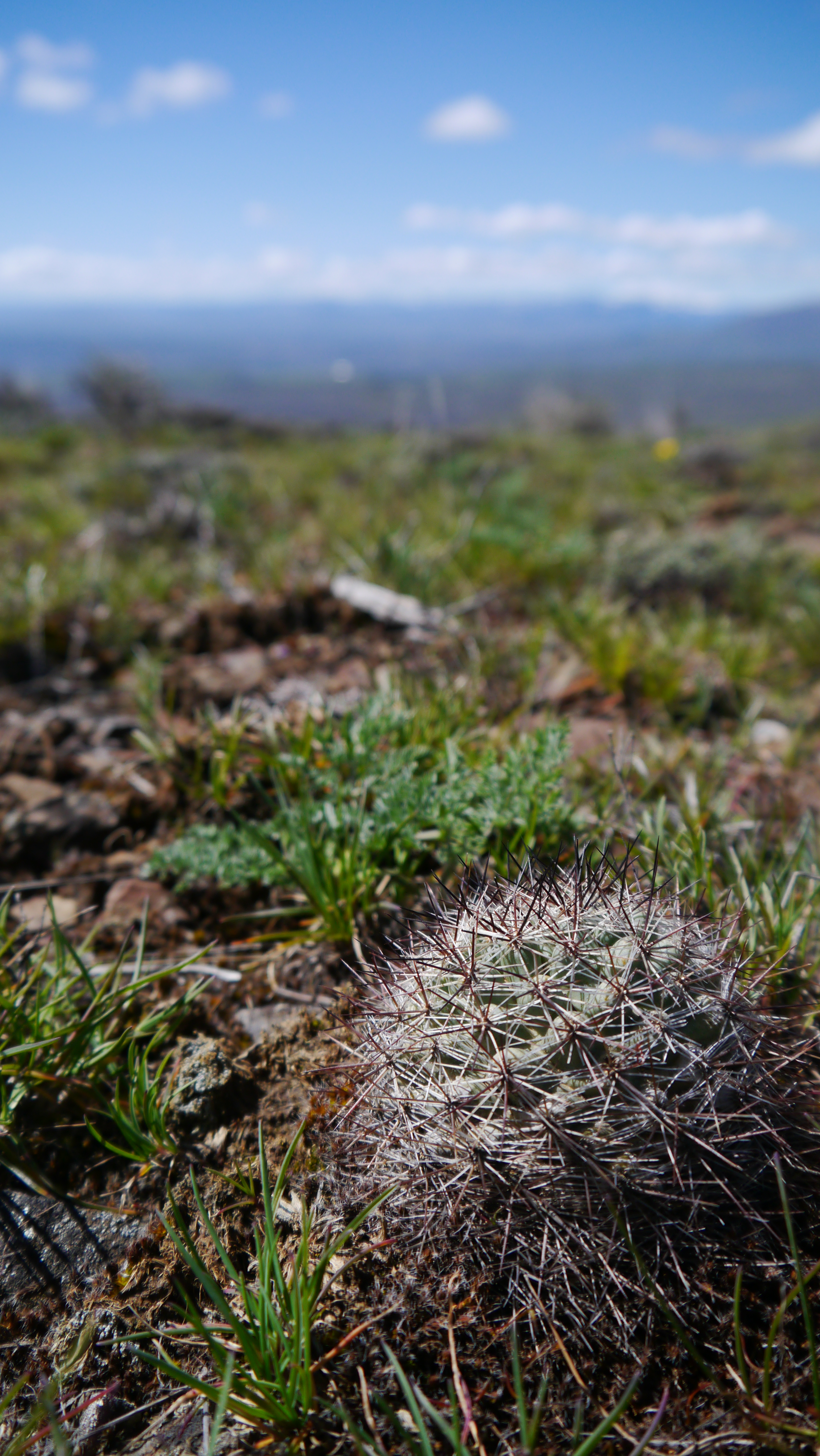
Growing in Kittitas County, Washington

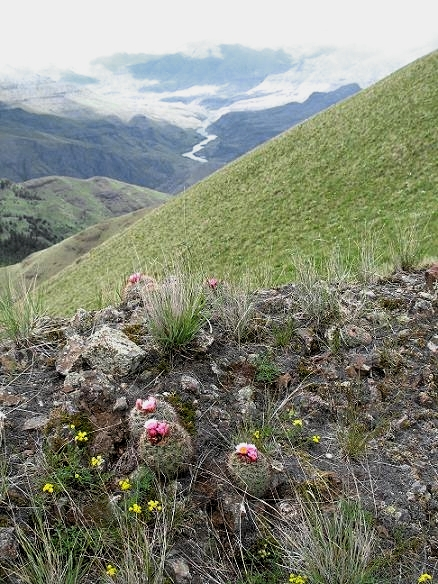
Growing near the Salmon River in Idaho

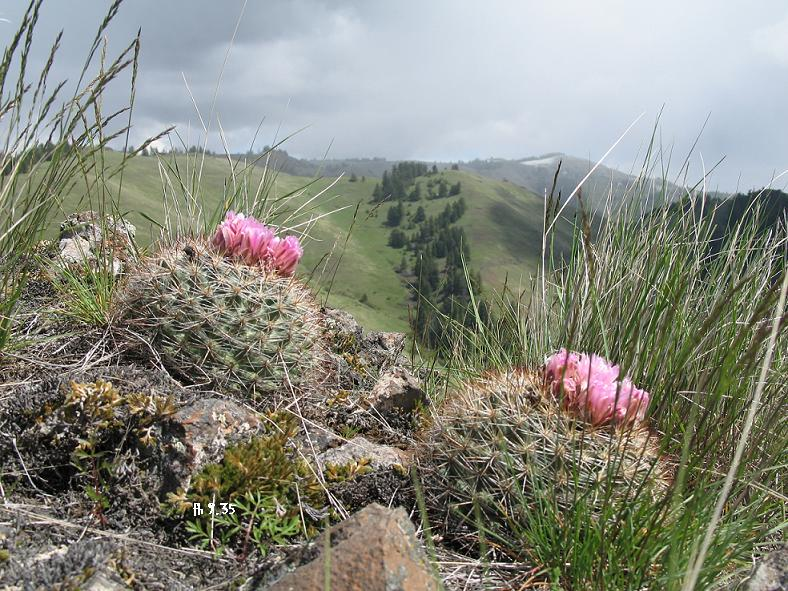
Growing in habitat in Idaho

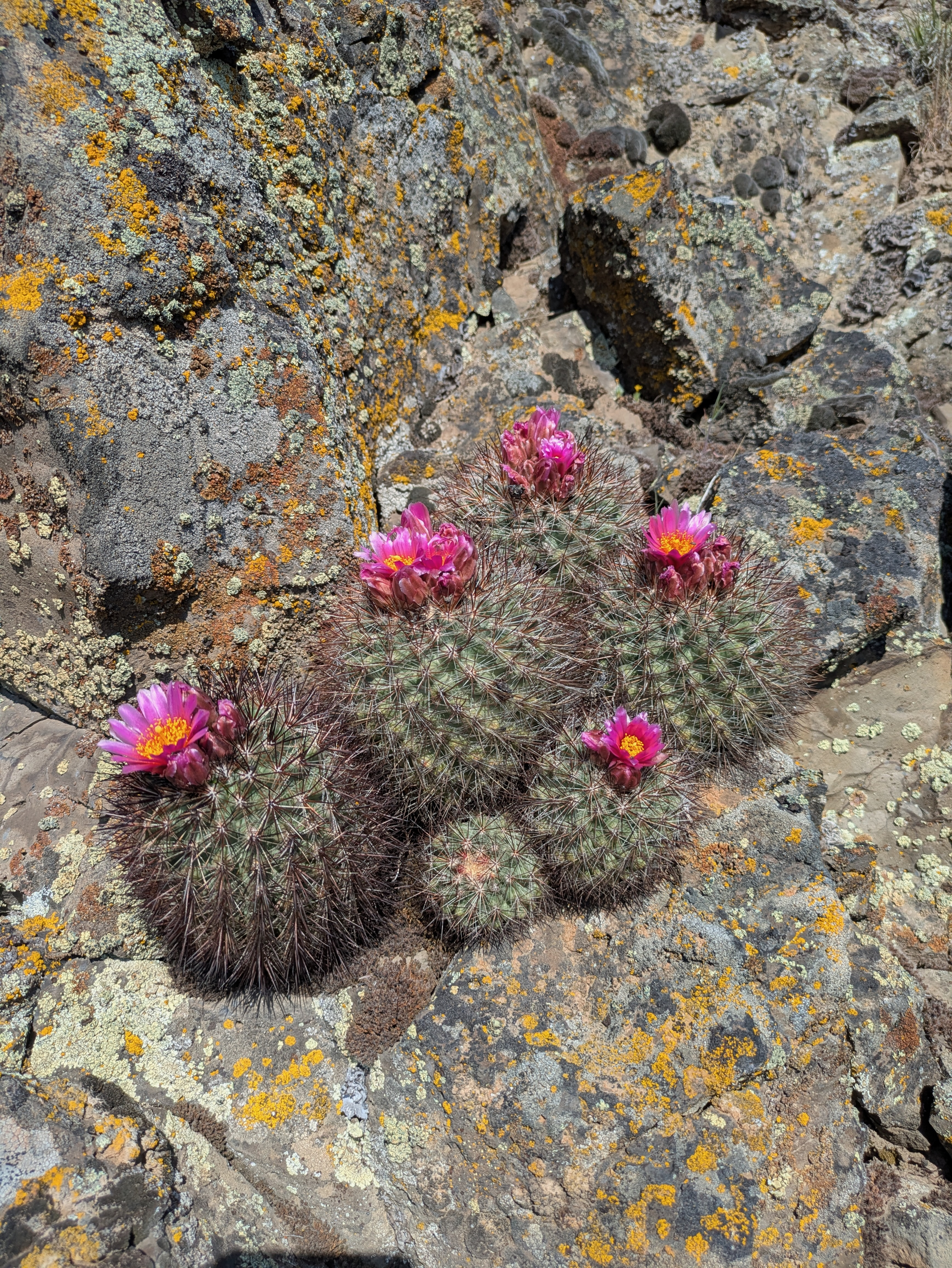
Growing on basalt outcrop in Kittitas County, Washington
