= Edward Frederick Anderson =

American botanist

Edward Frederick Anderson (Covina, California, June 17, 1932 – March 29, 2001) was an American botanist who conducted extensive explorations in Mexico.

He was a leading specialist in the cactus family. He was Senior Research Botanist at the Desert Botanical Garden, Phoenix. He chaired the International Organization for Succulent Plant Study. He was a member of the Cactus and Succulent Society of America and the Linnean Society of London. He was emeritus professor of biology at Whitman College, where he taught for three decades.

He collected Jasminocereus thouarsii.

== Books ==
- Peyote: The Divine Cactus. University of Arizona Press, Tucson 1981, ISBN 0-8165-0613-2
- Plants and People of the Golden Triangle: Ethnobotany of the Hill Tribes of Northern Thailand. Dioscorides Press, Portland (Oregon) 1993, ISBN 0-931146-25-9
- Threatened Cacti of Mexico. Balogh Scientific Books, Kew 1994, ISBN 0-947643-70-2 con Salvador Arias & Nigel P. Taylor
- The Cactus Family. Timber Press, Portland (Oregon) 2001, ISBN 0-88192-498-9
