= International Organization for Succulent Plant Study =

Organization about plants

- Formation: 1950
- Executive Board President: Dr. Héctor M. Hernández
- Website: http://succulentresearch.org/

The International Organization for Succulent Plant Study (IOS) describes itself as a "non-governmental organization promoting the study and conservation of succulent and allied plants and encouraging collaboration among scientists and curators of significant living collections of such plants, professional or amateur." In 1984, it was decided that the Cactaceae Section of the IOS should set up a working party, now called the International Cactaceae Systematics Group (ICSG), to produce consensus classifications of cacti down to the level of genera. Their system has been used as the basis of subsequent classifications.

The IOS focuses on global research and conservation of the succulent plant families (Agavaceae, Aloaceae, Cactaceae, Crassulaceae, Portulacaceae, Talinaceae). It later became the first plant conservation organization with a strict code of conduct for all members to follow, detailing principles to conduct field research, specimen collection, maintenance and management of field collected materials.

== Organization Structure ==
The IOS is run by a board of 6 executive members, these positions are elected by organization members for 2 year long terms. Executive positions include a President, a Vice-President, a Secretary, a Treasurer, an Assistant Secretary and an Archivist.

== Cactus D'Or Award ==
An accolade created by Princess Grace of Monaco in 1978, awarded by the Princess Grace to an outstanding member of the IOS that has greatly contributed to the field of succulent plant study. This award has been granted 17 times since its conception.

=== Award recipients ===
1. 1978: Werner Rauh, Germany
2. 1980: Helia Bravo Hollis, Mexico
3. 1982: Gordon Rowley, Great Britain
4. 1984: Lyman David Benson, USA
5. 1988: Leslie Charly (Larry) Leach, Great Britain
6. 1990: Walther Haage, Germany
7. 1992: George Edmund Lindsay, USA
8. 1994: Hans-Dieter Ihlenfeldt, Germany
9. 1996: Susan Carter Holmes, Great Britain
10. 1998: Edward Frederick Anderson, USA
11. 2000: Dietrich (Dieter) J. Supthut, Switzerland
12. 2002: Wilhelm Barthlott, Germany
13. 2004: Gideon F. Smith, South Africa
14. 2006: David Hunt, Great Britain
15. 2008: Len E. Newton, Great Britain
16. 2010: Myron W. Kimnach, USA
17. 2012: Heidrun Hartmann, Germany
