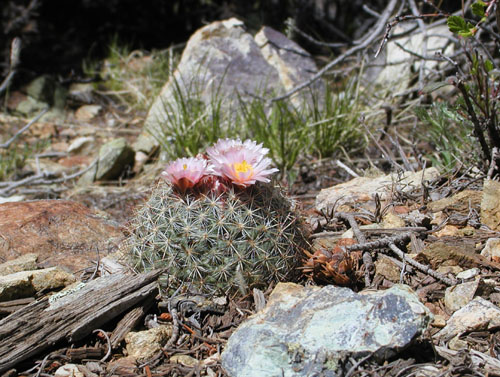
- Pediocactus simpsonii

Scientific classification
- Kingdom: Plantae
- Clade: Tracheophytes
- Clade: Angiosperms
- Clade: Eudicots
- Order: Caryophyllales
- Family: Cactaceae
- Subfamily: Cactoideae
- Tribe: Cacteae
- Genus: Pediocactus; Britton & Rose

Type species
- Pediocactus simpsonii

Species
- See text

= Pediocactus =

Genus of cacti

Pediocactus (Greek: πεδίον (pedion) means "plain", "flat", "field") is a genus of cacti native to the Western United States. The genus comprises between 6 and 11 species, depending upon the authority. Species of this genus are referred to as hedgehog cacti, though that name is also applied to plants from the genera Echinocereus and Echinopsis. Species may also be referred to as pincushion cacti, a common name which is also applied to other genera.

== Description ==
The Pediocactus genus includes small species of cactus that grow either individually or in clusters, reaching heights of up to 20 centimeters (7.9 in). The shoots, which can be green or glaucous, come in cylindrical, spherical, or depressed spherical shapes, with diameters ranging from 1 to 15 centimeters (0.39 to 5.91 in) and heights from 0.7 to 20 centimeters (0.28 to 7.87 in). Despite lacking ribs, these shoots have warts measuring 2 to 12 millimeters (0.079 to 0.472 in) in length and 2 to 11 millimeters (0.079 to 0.433 in) in diameter. The characteristic appearance is contributed to by the areoles, spaced 1 to 6 millimeters (0.039 to 0.236 in) apart (occasionally up to 12 millimeters (0.47 in)). The shoots also have thorns, varying in number, color, and orientation. There can be up to ten light gray or white central spines, measuring 0.5 to 3.2 centimeters (0.20 to 1.26 in), and three to 35 reddish to whitish marginal spines, which can be straight, curved, or comb-shaped, extending 0.1 to 2.1 centimeters (0.039 to 0.827 in) in length.

The bell-shaped flowers at the top of the shoots come in colors ranging from yellow to magenta to white, with diameters of 1 to 2.5 centimeters (0.39 to 0.98 in). The flowers are characterized by a glabrous or nearly glabrous pericarpel and a short floral tube. Flowering typically occurs in spring, but certain species form buds in late autumn, with some capable of flowering even in their juvenile stages.

The fruits, initially greenish and cylindrical to spherical, transform into reddish-brown, dry structures upon ripening. Opening with a vertical gap, the fruits may be bare or possess a few scales. As the fruit opens, the remaining flower partially detaches, leaving a residue resembling a cap. The fruits contain blackish-brown, wrinkled to tuberous, obovate, or pear-shaped seeds. These seeds ripen 4 to 6 weeks after flowering and remain viable for an exceptionally long period, lasting at least 10 years.

== Species ==
As of January 2025, Plants of the World Online accepts the following species:

Image	Scientific name	Distribution
	Pediocactus bradyi L.D.Benson	Northern Arizona
	Pediocactus despainii S.L.Welsh & Goodrich	Central Utah
	Pediocactus hajekii Hochstätter	Southeast Oregon
	Pediocactus indranus (Hochstätter) Hochstätter	East-northeast Idaho
	Pediocactus knowltonii L.D.Benson	San Juan County, New Mexico
	Pediocactus nigrispinus (Hochstätter) Hochstätter	Idaho, Oregon, Washington
	Pediocactus paradinei B.W.Benson	Arizona
	Pediocactus peeblesianus (Croizat) L.D.Benson	Arizona
	Pediocactus sileri (Daul) L.D.Benson	southwestern Utah and northwestern Arizona
	Pediocactus simpsonii (Engelm.) Britton & Rose	Arizona, Colorado, Idaho, Montana, Nevada, New Mexico, South Dakota, Utah, Wyoming
	Pediocactus winkleri K.D.Heil	Central Utah

== Synonyms ==
The genus has 3 synonyms:

- Navajoa Croizat
- Pilocanthus B.W.Benson & Backeb.
- Utahia Britton & Rose

Sclerocactus and Pediocactus were also at one time reduced to synonymy, but this is not at present considered to be correct.
