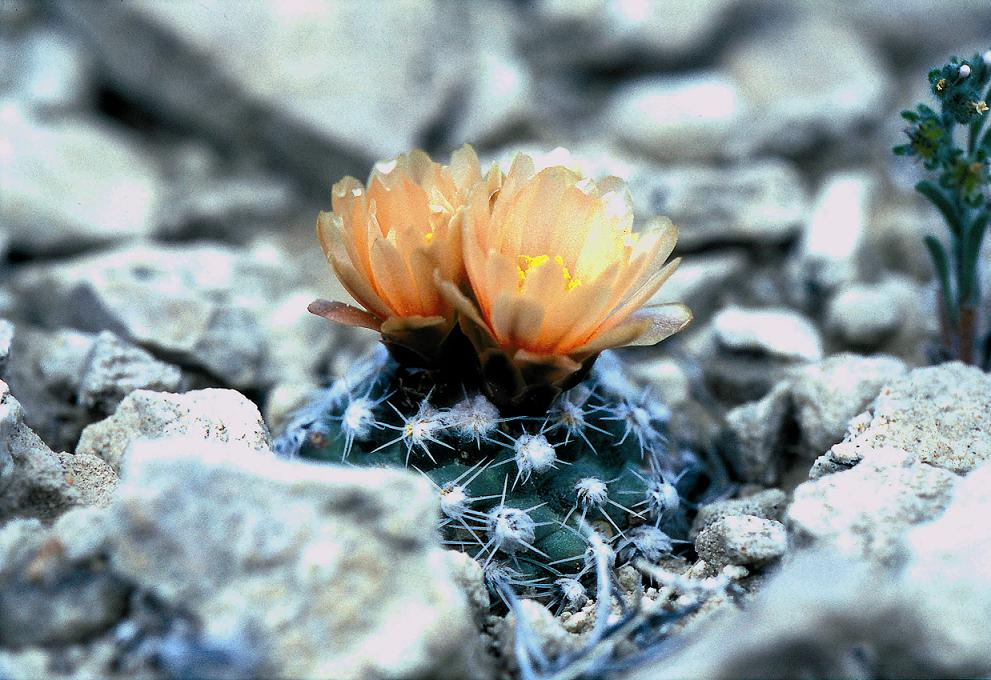
- Flowering Pediocactus winkleri in April in Utah

Conservation status
- Threatened (ESA)

- Least Concern (IUCN 2.3)

Scientific classification
- Kingdom: Plantae
- Clade: Tracheophytes
- Clade: Angiosperms
- Clade: Eudicots
- Order: Caryophyllales
- Family: Cactaceae
- Subfamily: Cactoideae
- Genus: Pediocactus
- Species: P. bradyi
- Subspecies: P. b. subsp. winkleri

Trinomial name
- Pediocactus bradyi subsp. winkleri (K.D.Heil) Hochstätter ex D.R.Hunt

Synonyms
- Pediocactus bradyi var. winkleri (K.D.Heil) Hochstätter 1994; Pediocactus simpsonii var. winkleri (K.D.Heil) Halda 1998; Pediocactus winkleri K.D.Heil 1979; Puebloa bradyi subsp. winkleri (K.D.Heil) Doweld 1999; Puebloa bradyi var. winkleri (K.D.Heil) Doweld 1999

= Pediocactus bradyi subsp. winkleri =

Species of cactus

Pediocactus bradyi subsp. winkleri, commonly known as Winkler's cactus or Winkler's pincushion cactus, is a small cactus endemic to the state of Utah in the United States. It is known only from Emery and Wayne Counties.

== Description ==
Pediocactus bradyi subsp. winkleri is a round cactus has mostly unbranched subglobose to obovoid stems, standing between 2.5 and 6.5 cm in height and reaching up to 5 cm in diameter. The areoles, which are woolly and elliptic to circular, contain clusters of 8 to 14 small radial spines that spread downward, measuring 1.5-4 mm. These spines are white or whitish to tan, with no erect central spines. The plant blooms in early spring. The flowers of Pediocactus bradyi subsp. winkleri are funnel-shaped, displaying a peach-to-pink color and measuring 1.8 to 2.5 cm in length and 1.8 to 3.8 cm in diameter.The fruit is green, drying to a reddish-brown, barrel-shaped structure, with dimensions of 0.7-1.0 cm in height and 0.8-1.1 cm in width.

== Distribution ==
Pediocactus bradyi subsp. winkleri is a species found in small, scattered populations within a confined and isolated region in central Utah, extending from near Notom in central Wayne County to Fremont Junction in southwestern Emery County, and near Ferron in western Emery County. It thrives at elevations ranging from 1400 to 2100 meters. Typically growing in sandy hilltops and slopes with alkaline silty loam or clay loam soils, often enriched with gypsum, this desert-dwelling plant displays distinct characteristics. The cactus is cold-hardy

== Taxonomy ==
This cactus was first documented in the early 1960s by Mrs. Agnes Winkler who was traveling with her then teenage son, Jim Winkler, in Utah's San Rafael Swell. Dr. Lyman Benson had earlier named a species that was then thought to be the same or that was similar (Pediocactus bradyi, discovered in Arizona in 1958 and which only occurs there). It was not until 1979 that botanist Ken Heil recognized P. winkleri as a new species. The Winklers had noticed the cactus during a vacation to Capitol Reef. Upon returning home to New Mexico, Mrs. Winkler sent a letter to local botanist Ken Heil along with a picture and habitat description. Heil had started to undertake botanical work in southern Utah and located the population based on Mrs. Winkler's description.

Since the intention of the author was to honor Mrs. Agnes Winkler (see the "New in 2012" section and specifically the first 2/17/12 entry on the What's New page of the Utah Rare Plant Guide), its specific epithet should have been "winklerae." Because that intent was not specifically outlined in the original description, changing the name to "winklerae" may require a formal committee request rather than relying on Article 60.11 of the International Code of Botanical Nomenclature which would allow for correction if the intent was clear.

In 1999 David Hunt listed the cactus as a provisionally accepted taxon under the name of Pediocactus bradyi subsp. winkleri in the Second Edition of the CITES Cactaceae Checklist. DNA analyses conducted to date however have shown that neither Pediocactus despainii nor this taxon are related to Pediocactus bradyi and that both P. despainii and P. winkleri are likely more closely related instead to P. simpsonii.

Pediocactus bradyi subsp. winkleri was listed as a threatened species under the Endangered Species Act on August 20, 1998. As with many other cactus species, its most serious threat relates to poaching by plant collectors (but is also threatened by off-road vehicle use).
