= Lyman David Benson =

American botanist (1909–1993)

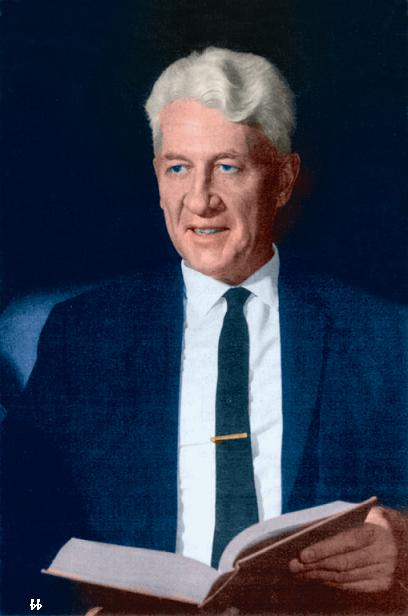
- Lyman Benson (undated)
- Born: 1909
- Died: 1993 (aged 83–84)
- Citizenship: United States of America
- Occupations: botanist, university teacher
- Awards: Cactus d’Or (1984)

Lyman David Benson (1909–1993) was an American botanist and author of Taxon names. He established roughly 500 names for cacti as well as 14 other taxon names.

Benson won the Cactus d’Or award from the International Organization for Succulent Plant Study in 1984.

== Works ==
- 1957. Plant Classification. Ed. Heath, Boston. 688 pages.
- 1969. The Cacti of Arizona. 3ª ed. U.Arizona, Tucson. 218 pages. ISBN 0-8165-0509-8
- 1969. The Native Cacti of California. Ed. Stan. U, Stanford. 243 pages. ISBN 0-8047-0696-4
- 1981. Trees and Shrubs of the Southwestern Deserts. Ed. Univ. of Arizona. ISBN 0-8165-0591-8
- 1982. The Cacti of the United States and Canada. Stanford University Press. 1044 pages. ISBN 0-8047-0863-0
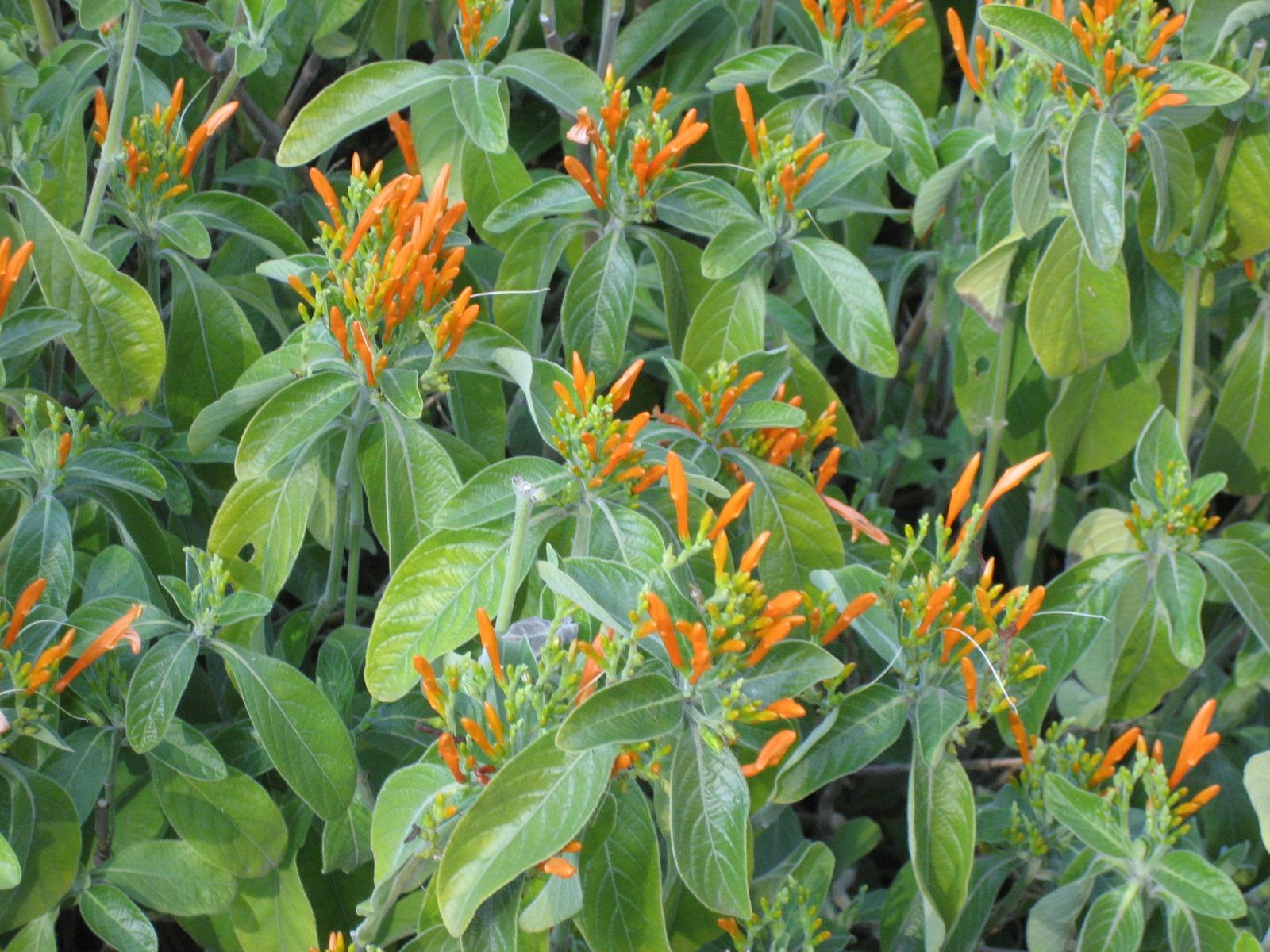
Justicia candicans

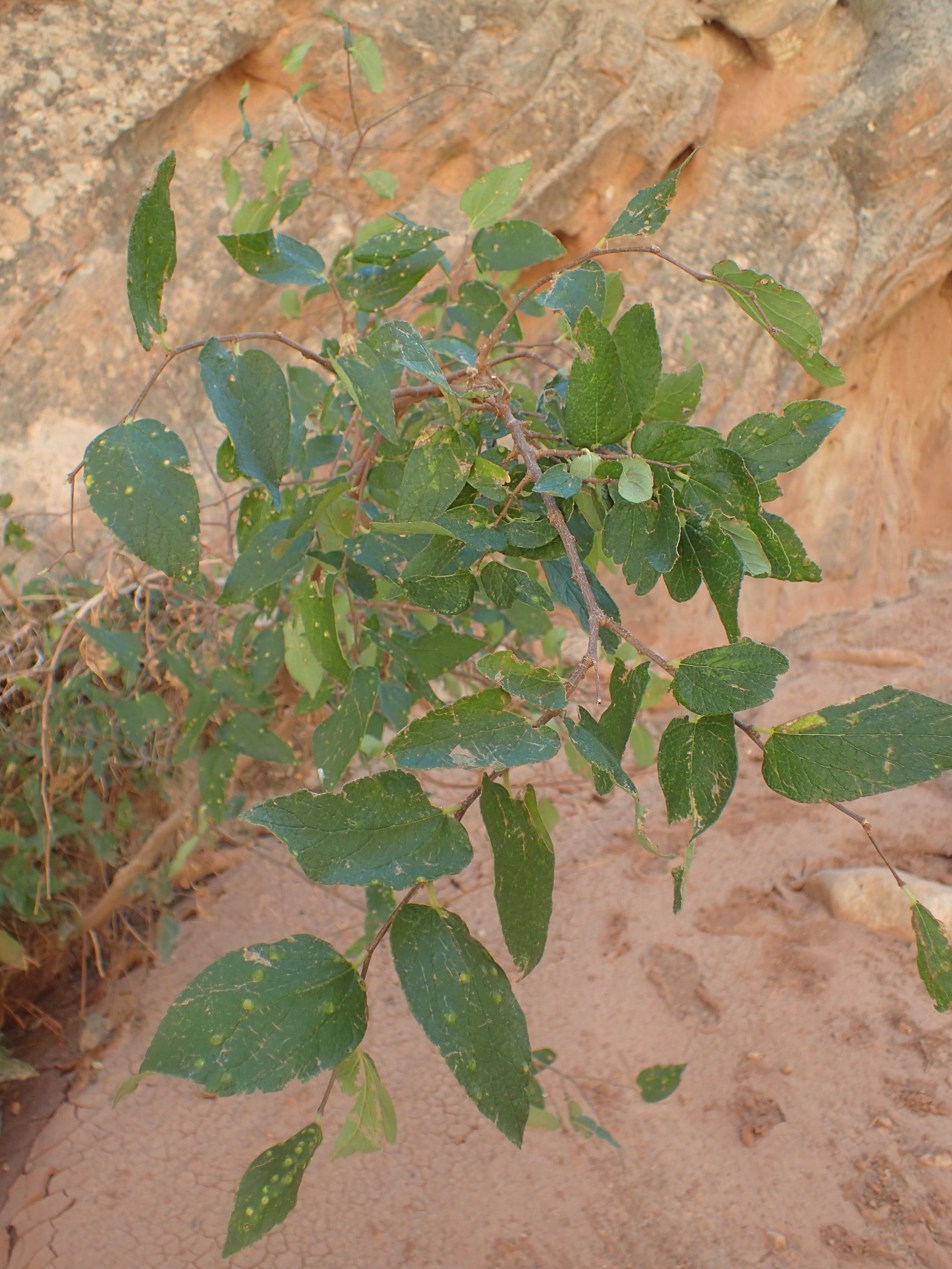
Celtis reticulata
