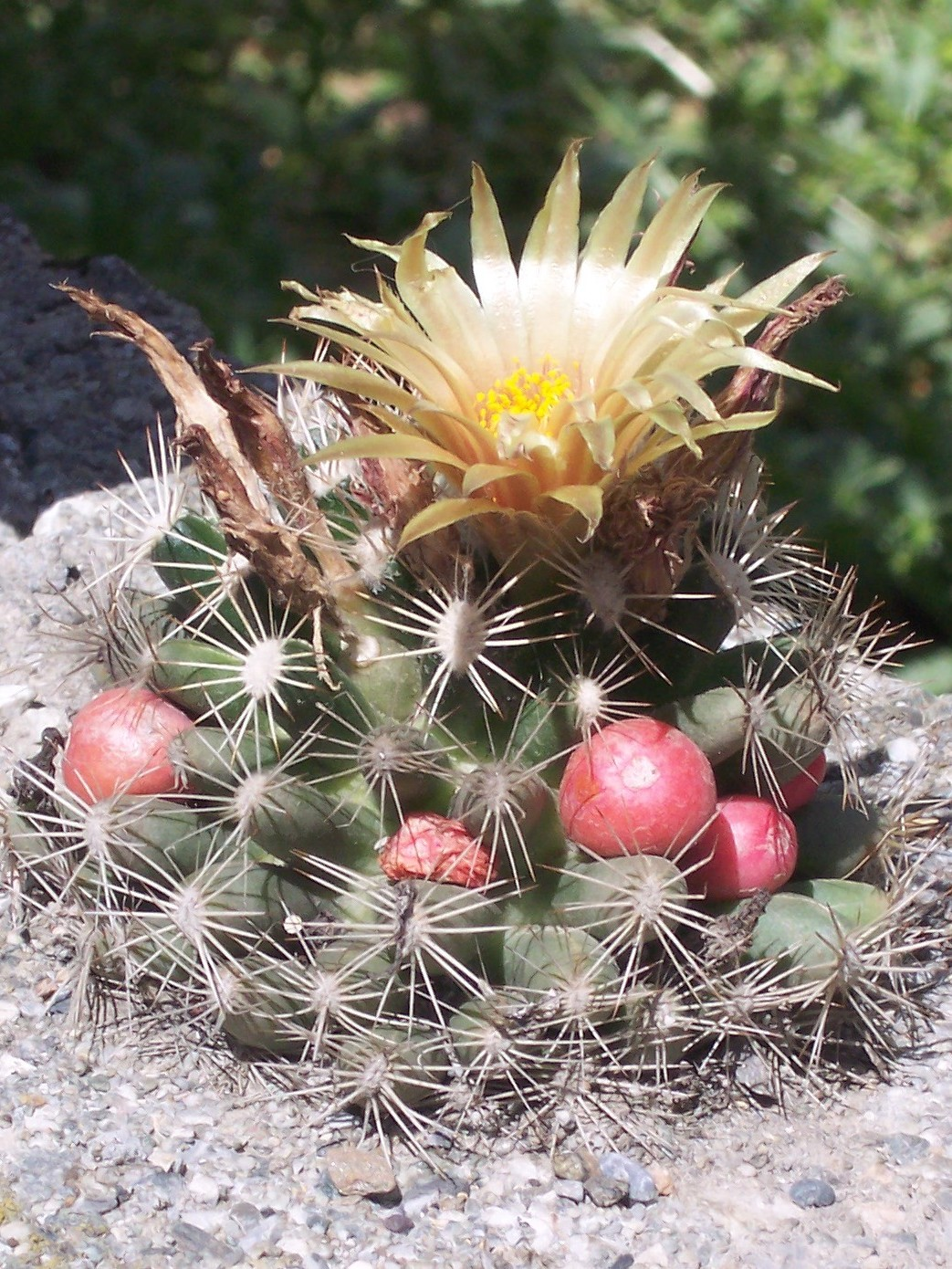

Conservation status
- Least Concern (IUCN 3.1)

- Secure (NatureServe)

Scientific classification
- Kingdom: Plantae
- Clade: Tracheophytes
- Clade: Angiosperms
- Clade: Eudicots
- Order: Caryophyllales
- Family: Cactaceae
- Subfamily: Cactoideae
- Genus: Pelecyphora
- Species: P. missouriensis

Binomial name
- Pelecyphora missouriensis (Sweet) D.Aquino & Dan.Sánchez

Synonyms
- Synonymy: Cactus missouriensis (Sweet) Kuntze; Coryphantha missouriensis (Scheer) Britton & Rose; Coryphantha similis (Engelm.) Britton & Rose; Mammillaria missouriensis Sweet; Neobesseya missouriensis (Sweet) Britton & Rose; Neobesseya similis (Engelm.) Britton & Rose; Neomammillaria missouriensis (Sweet) Britton & Rose ex Rydb.; Escobaria asperispina (Boed.) D.R.Hunt, syn of subsp. asperispina; Escobaria missouriensis (Sweet) D.R.Hunt

= Pelecyphora missouriensis =

Species of cactus

Pelecyphora missouriensis, the Missouri foxtail cactus and formerly Coryphantha missouriensis, is a species of low-growing North American cacti.

== Description ==
Pelecyphora missouriensis grows up to 30 centimetres (12 in) high and forms clumps to 3.8–30 centimetres (1.5–11.8 in) or greater in diameter. They are generally larger in the Southwest. The plants are primarily unbranched, except eastern populations that can be profusely branched. The warts are elongated and up to 18 millimeters long. There are 10 to 20 spines that are bright white, pale gray, or pale tan, weathering to gray or yellowish brown. The plant blooms in April to June, with flowers that are pale greenish yellow to yellow-green with midstripes of green or rose-pink to pale brown, flowers are 2.5 to 6.2 centimeters long and in diameter. The red fruits are 1 to 2 centimeters long.

Pelecyphora missouriensis has been extirpated from many of its historically known sites by introduced fire ants, suburban development, brush encroachment following fire suppression, and over-grazing.

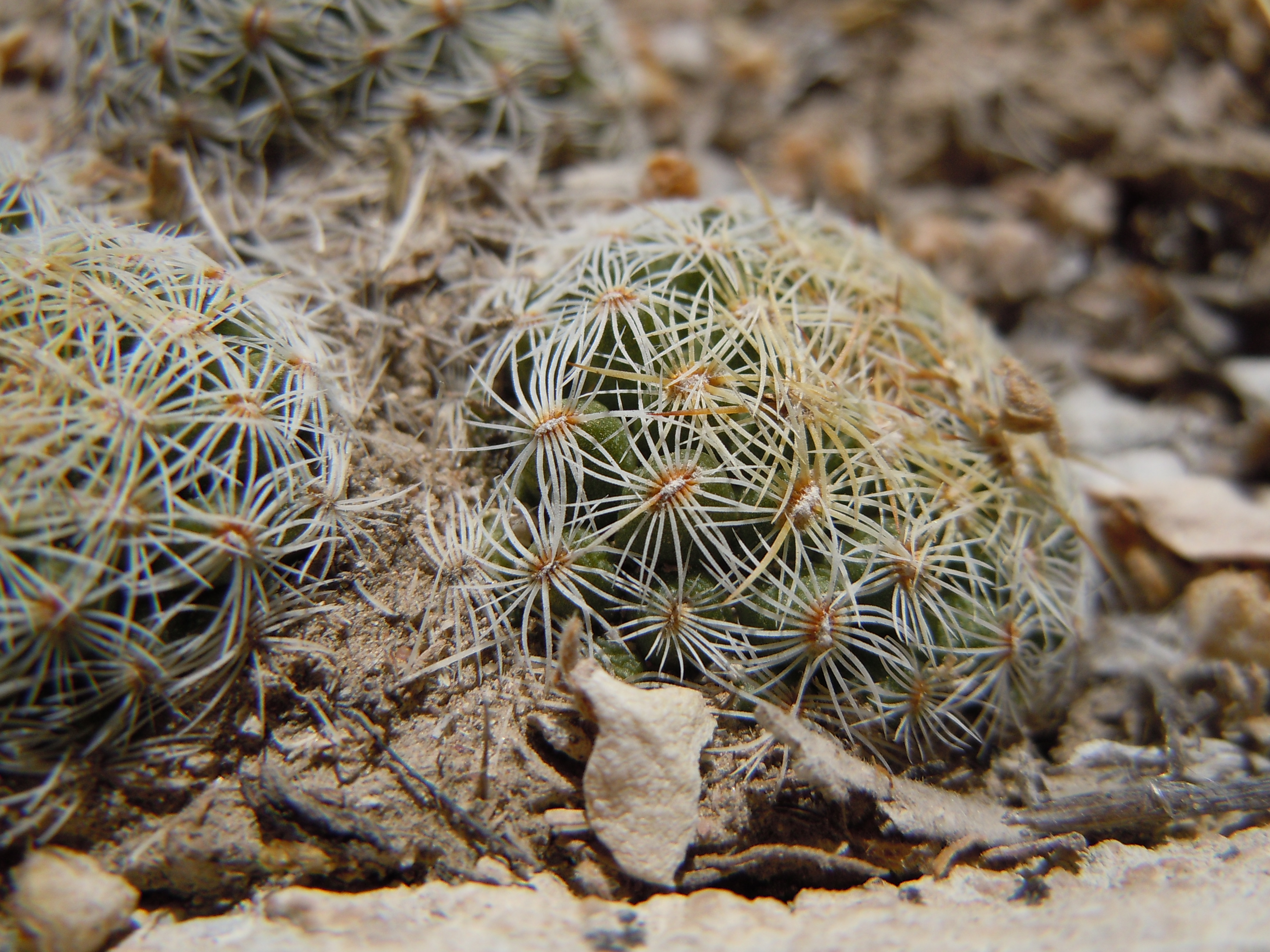
Plant

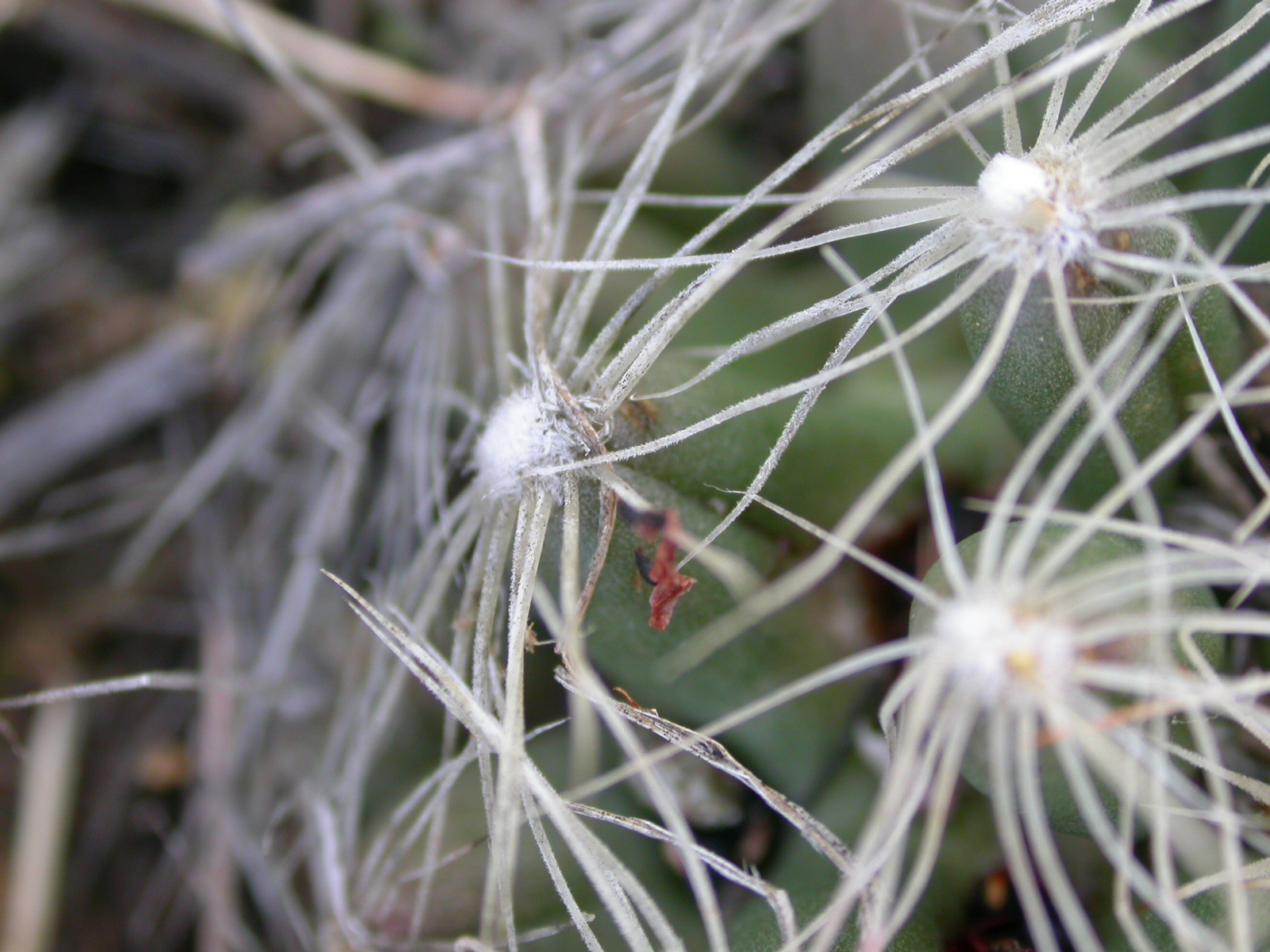
Spines

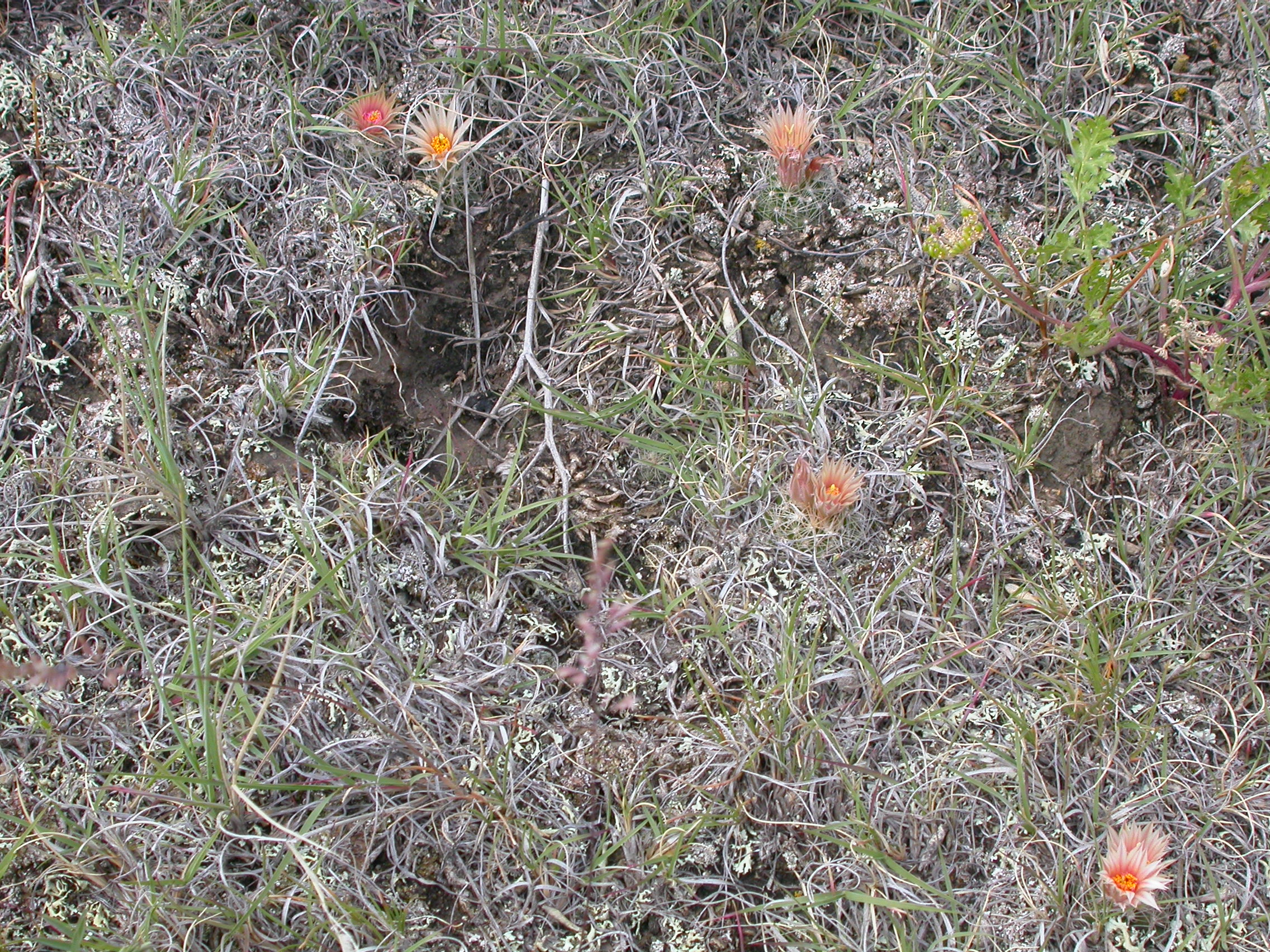
Growing in habitat

=== Subspecies ===
There are two recognized subspecies.

Image	Name	Distribution
	Pelecyphora missouriensis subsp. asperispina (Boed.) N.P.Taylor	Mexico (Coahuila de Zaragoza, Nuevo Leon)
	Pelecyphora missouriensis subsp. missouriensis	United States (Arizona, Colorado, Illinois, Kansas, Missouri, Montana, Nebraska, New Mexico, North Dakota, Oklahoma, South Dakota, Texas, Utah, Wyoming )

== Distribution ==
It is found in along the Missouri River in the tallgrass prairie and shortgrass Great Plains, from Texas to Montana and the Dakotas, and in the Rocky Mountains woodlands of Ponderosa pine (Pinus ponderosa), pinyon-juniper, and Gambel oak (Quercus gambelii) west of it. It is also native to the Southwestern United States in Idaho, Kansas,Arizona, New Mexico, and Utah and Mexico in the states of Coahuila and Nuevo León.

== Taxonomy ==
It was first described in 1818 by Thomas Nuttall as Cactus mammillaris. The specific epithet missouriensis refers to the occurrence of the species near the Missouri River. However, this description was not valid (nom. illegal ICBN article 53.1), as the name was already given by Carl Linnaeus in 1753. Robert Sweet named the species Mammillaria missouriensis in 1826. In 1978, the species was reclassified as Escobaria missouriensis by David Richard Hunt. David Aquino & Daniel Sánchez moved the species to Pelecyphora based on phylogenetic studies in 2022. Further nomenclature synonyms are Cactus missouriensis (Sweet) Kuntze (1891), Mammillaria missouriensis Sweet ex K.Schum. (1898), Coryphantha missouriensis (Sweet) Britton & Rose (1913), Neobesseya missouriensis (Sweet) Britton & Rose (1923) and Neomammillaria missouriensis (Sweet) Britton & Rose ex Rydb. (1932).
