= Kalmenhof =

Social pedagogical institution in Idstein, Hesse, Germany

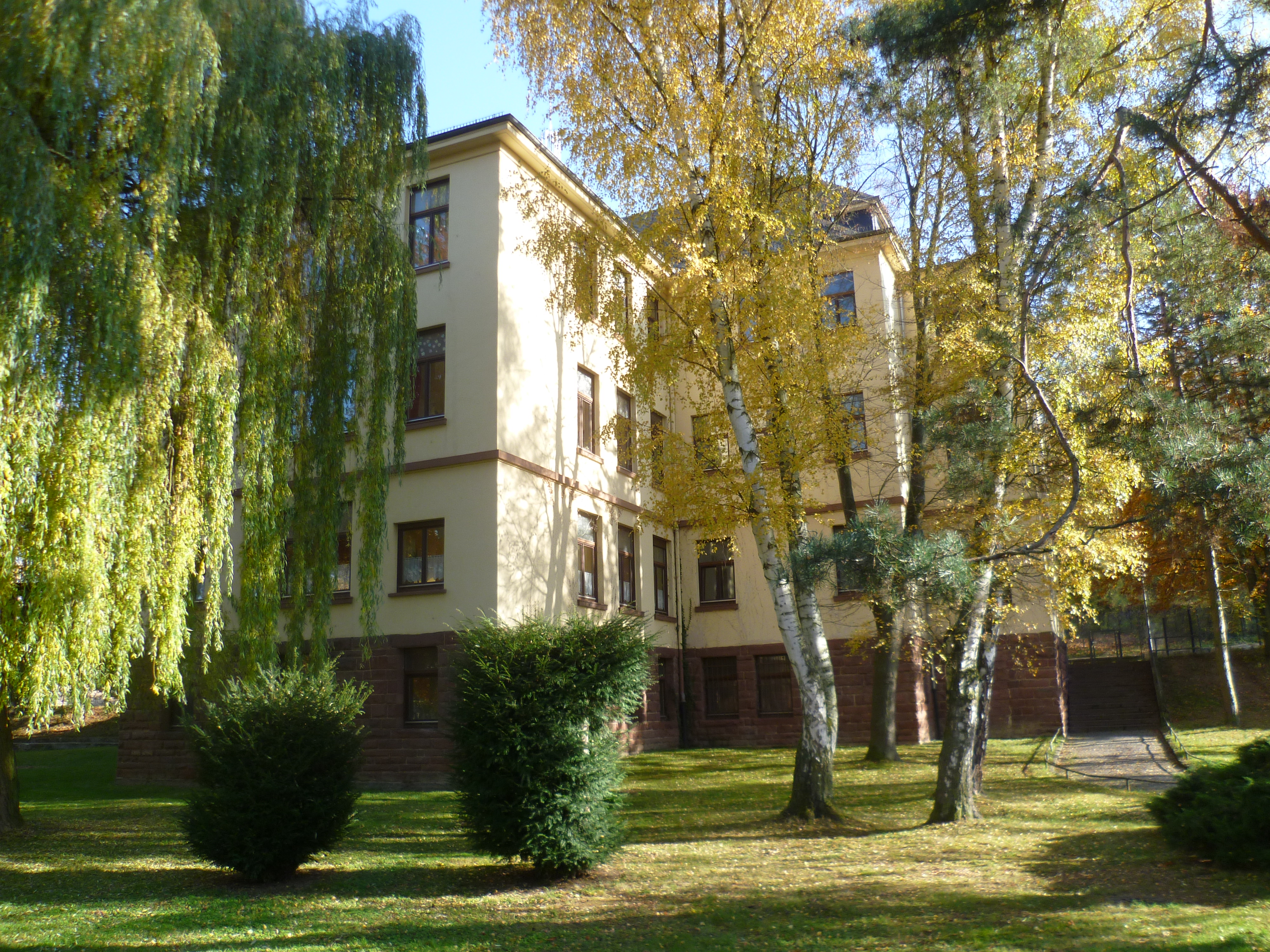
The Buchenhaus in Kalmenhof

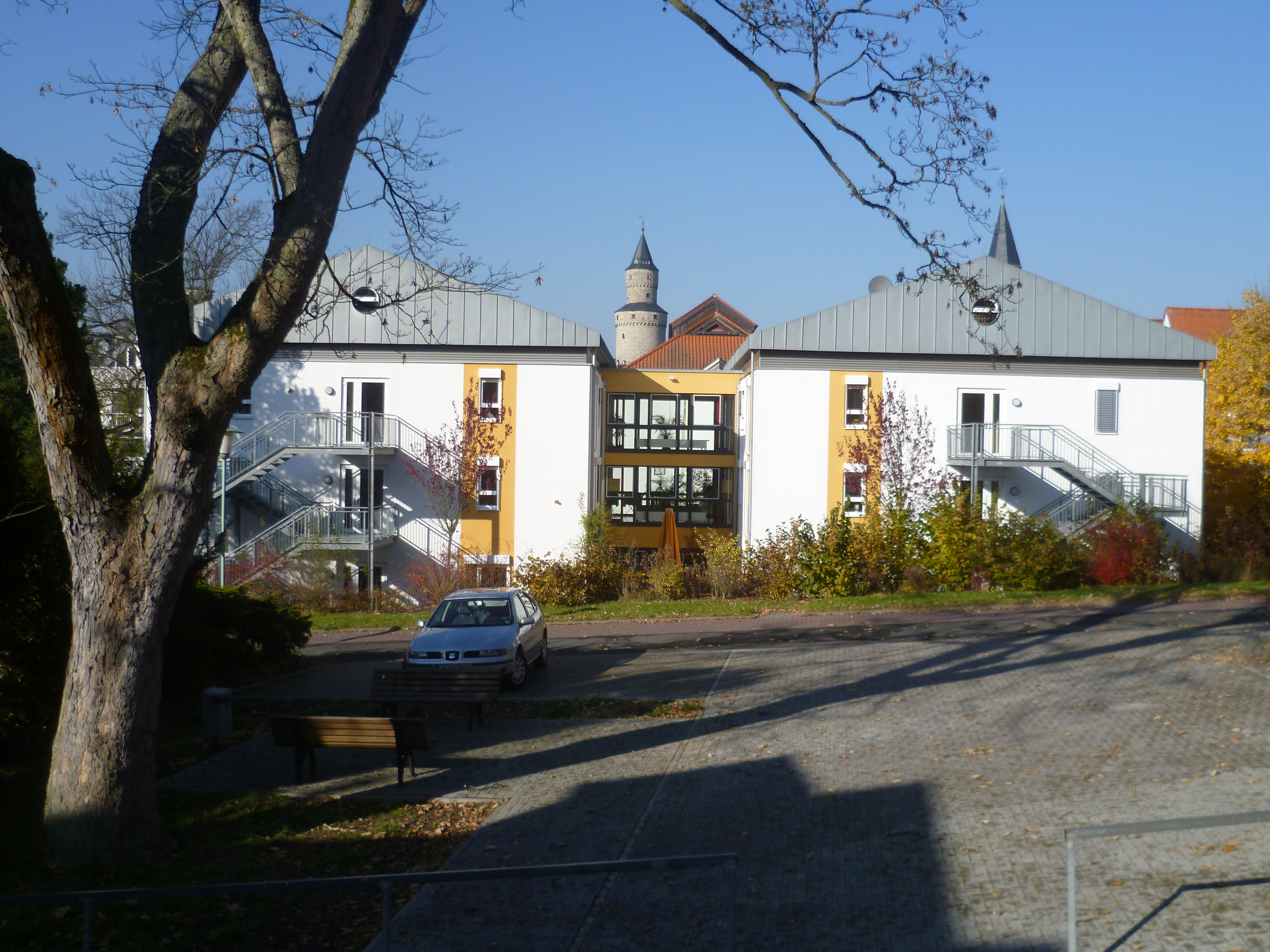
The Rudolph-Ehlers-Haus. In the background, Idstein's landmark, the Hexenturm.

The Kalmenhof is a social pedagogical institution dedicated to youth and disability care, including training and educational facilities, located in the regional hub of Idstein, Hesse, a former Nassau residence town. Several buildings within the Kalmenhof complex (historically known as Calmenhof, Idiotenanstalt Idstein, or Calmischer Hof) are protected under heritage designation. The institution is managed by a subsidiary of Vitos GmbH.

Established in 1888 as a care and treatment facility, Kalmenhof has a multifaceted history tracing back to the Middle Ages. During the Nazi era, it functioned as an intermediate facility for the Hadamar Euthanasia Centre, where hundreds of euthanasia murders took place in its children's ward. The involvement of certain Kalmenhof staff in Nazi racial hygiene crimes was examined during the 1947 Kalmenhof trial. After the Landeswohlfahrtsverband Hessen assumed control, severe cases of abuse against resident children were documented in the 1950s and 1960s. Reforms and restructuring commenced in the 1970s, with a thorough reckoning of the institution's Nazi past beginning in the early 1980s.

== Location and description ==
Overview of the central building complex of Kalmenhof

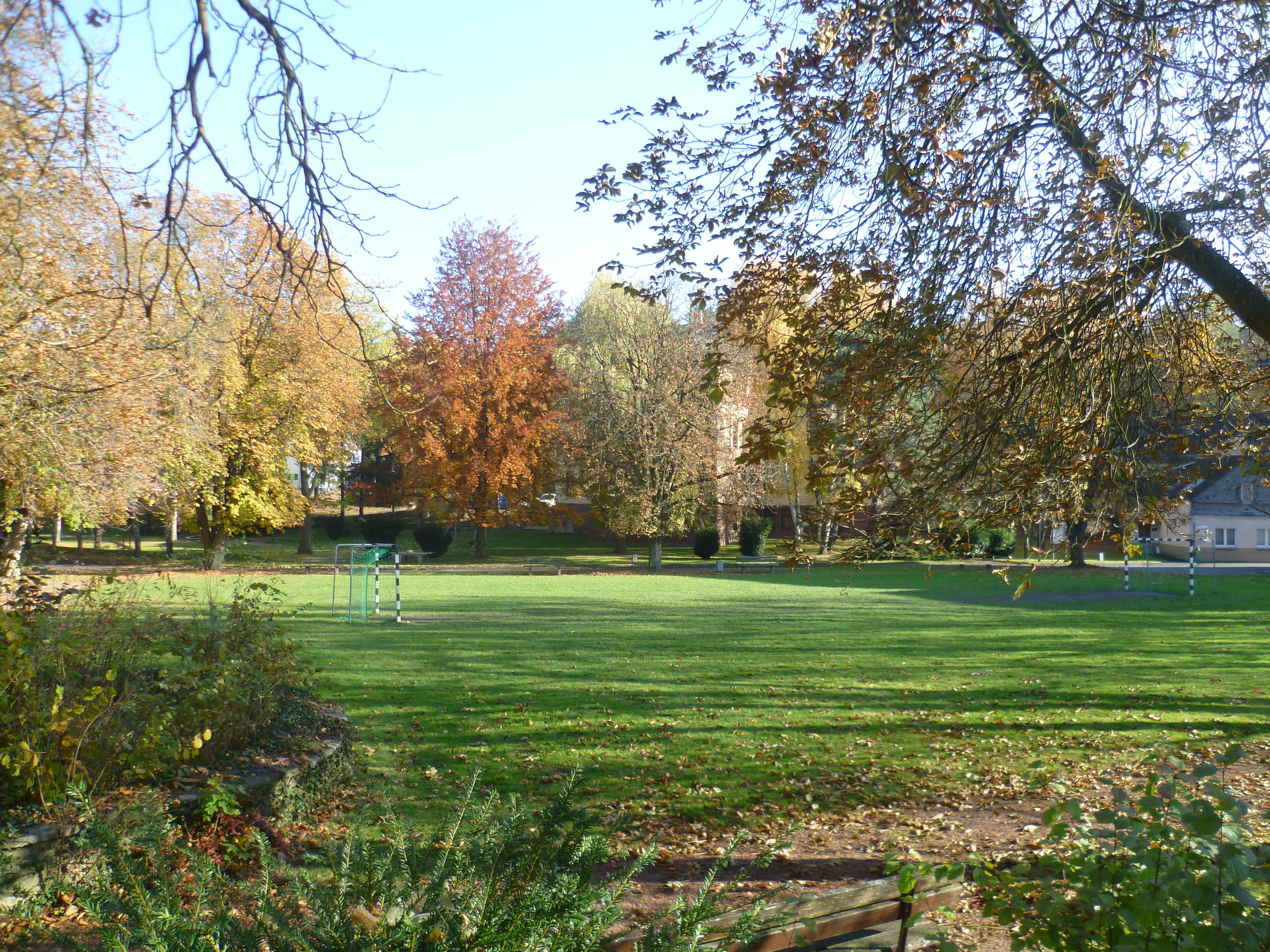
Outdoor areas of Kalmenhof with a view from the Directors’ Meadow toward the Buchenhaus

Kalmenhof is located just south of Idstein's historic old town, at the base of Taubenberg hill, on an approximately three-hectare site bordered by Veitenmühlweg, Schulze-Delitzsch-Straße, and Seelbacher Straße/Frölenberg. The Veitenmühlberg road runs through the site. The facility, situated at the foot of a slope with extensive green areas such as the Directors' Meadow, comprises multiple buildings.

Residential buildings include the Rudolph-Ehlers-Haus, Rosenhaus, Loni-Franz-Haus, and Buchenhaus, which houses the central kitchen. Additional structures include the Sternenhaus operational building with the Sternensaal, storage facilities, a staff residence, an outdoor swimming pool, workshops, the former hospital, a laundry, and the main building at the entrance. The buildings vary significantly in architectural style due to their different construction periods.

The nursery at Grunerstraße 41, the country house at Hofgut Gassenbach, and the Charles Hallgarten Youth Home (In der Ritzbach) are located outside the main site. The nursery features 3,500 square meters of greenhouse space and 8 hectares of land.

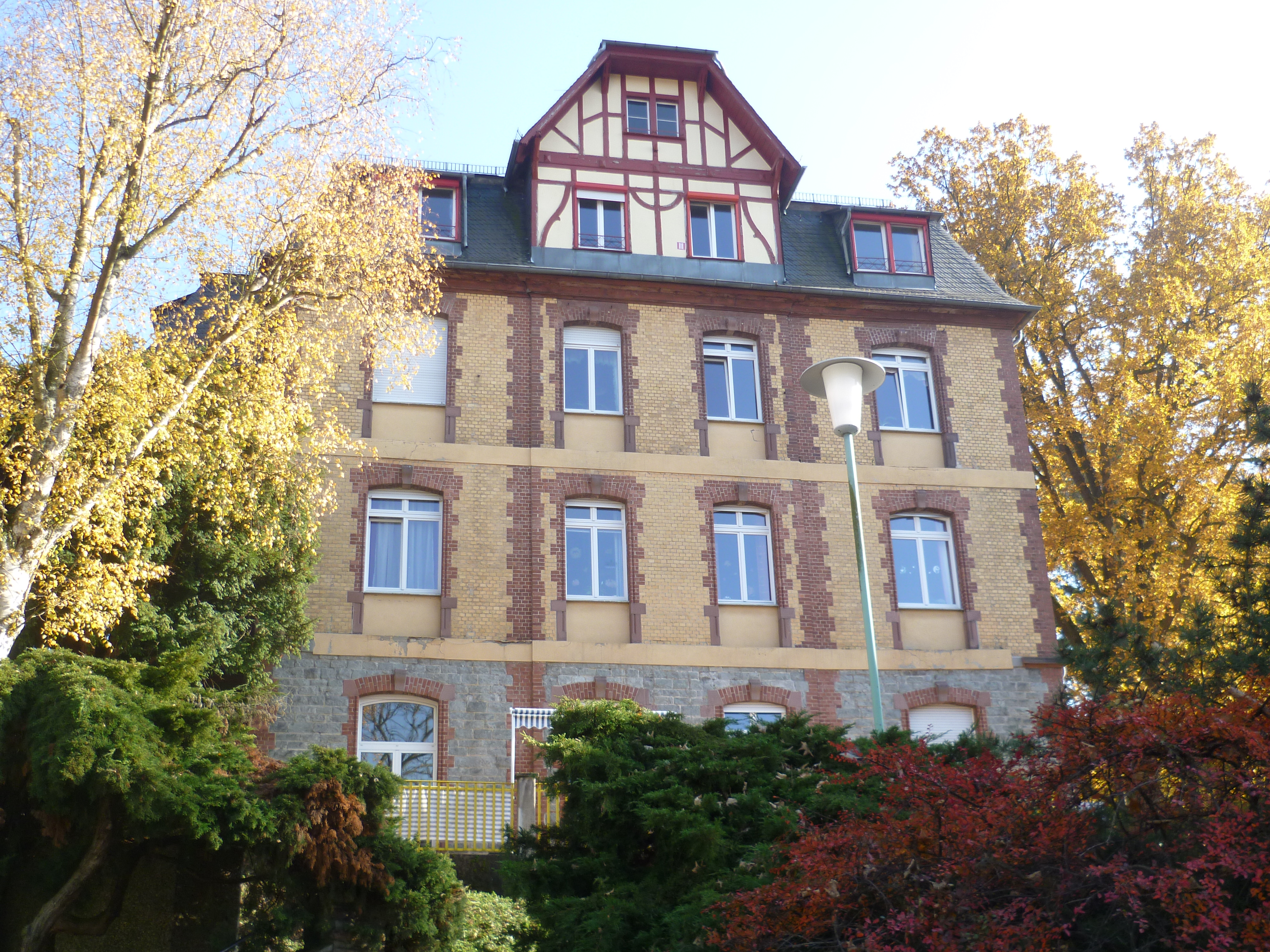
The Rosenhaus

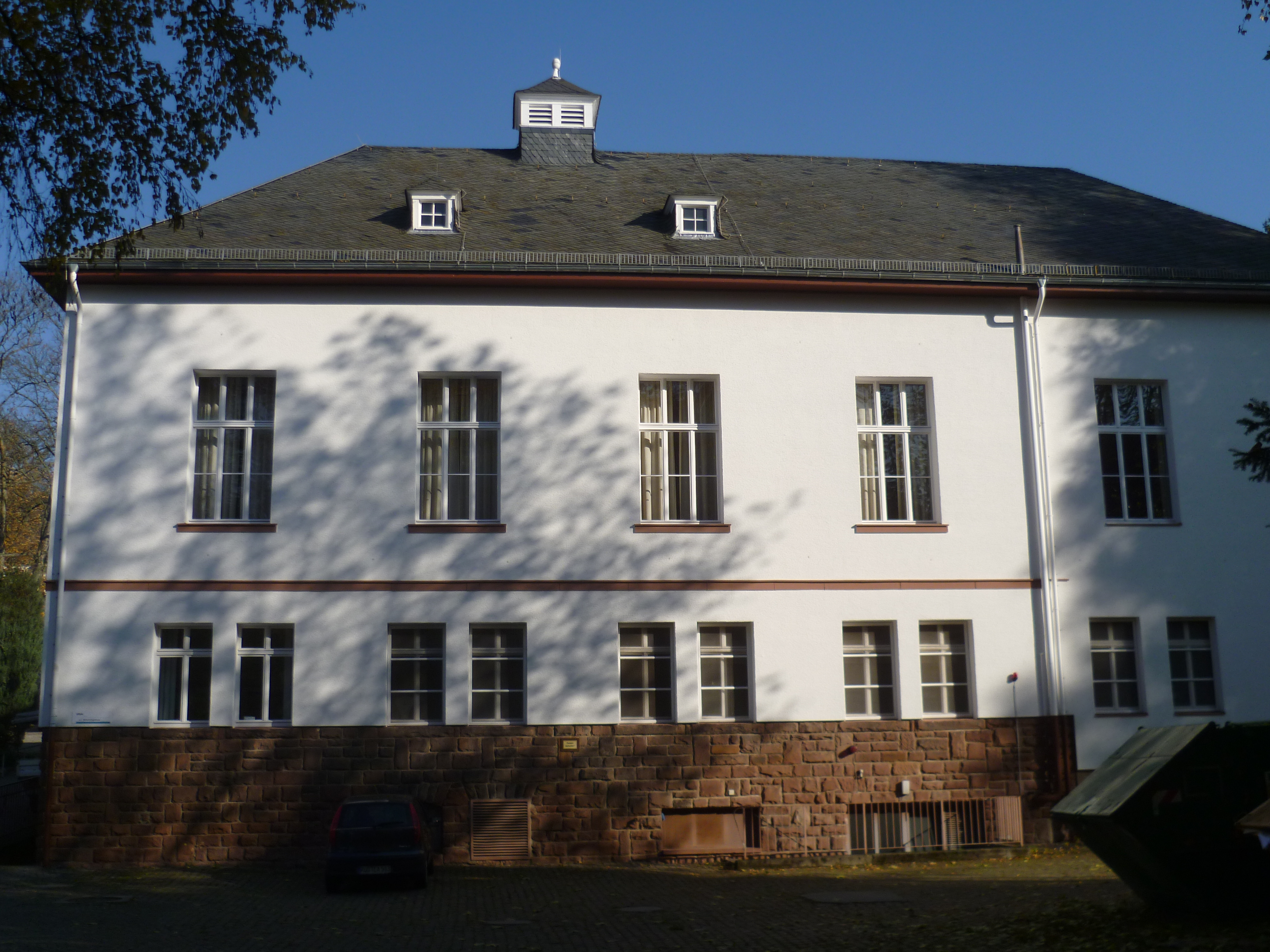
The Sternenhaus

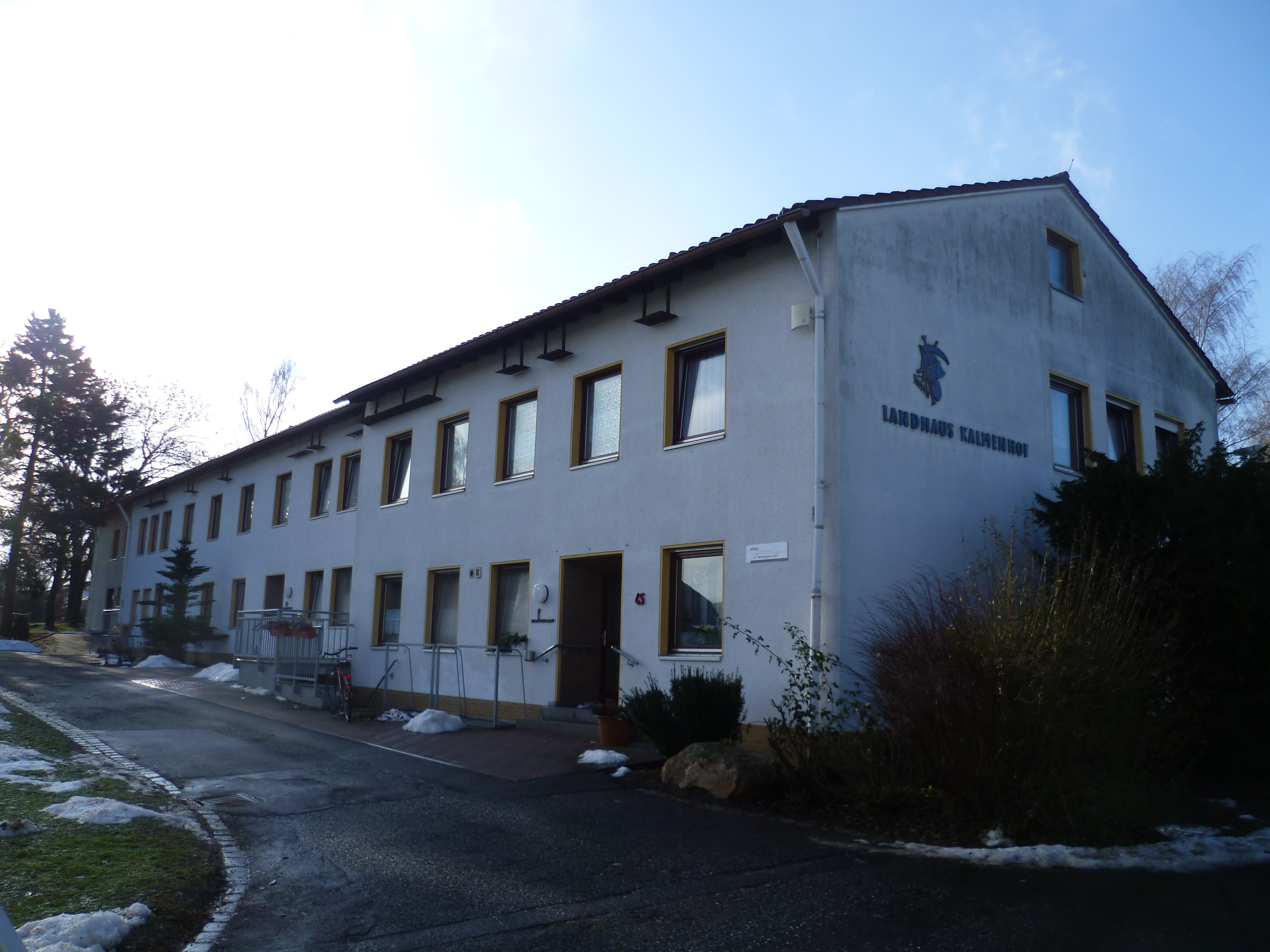
The Landhaus at Hofgut Gassenbach

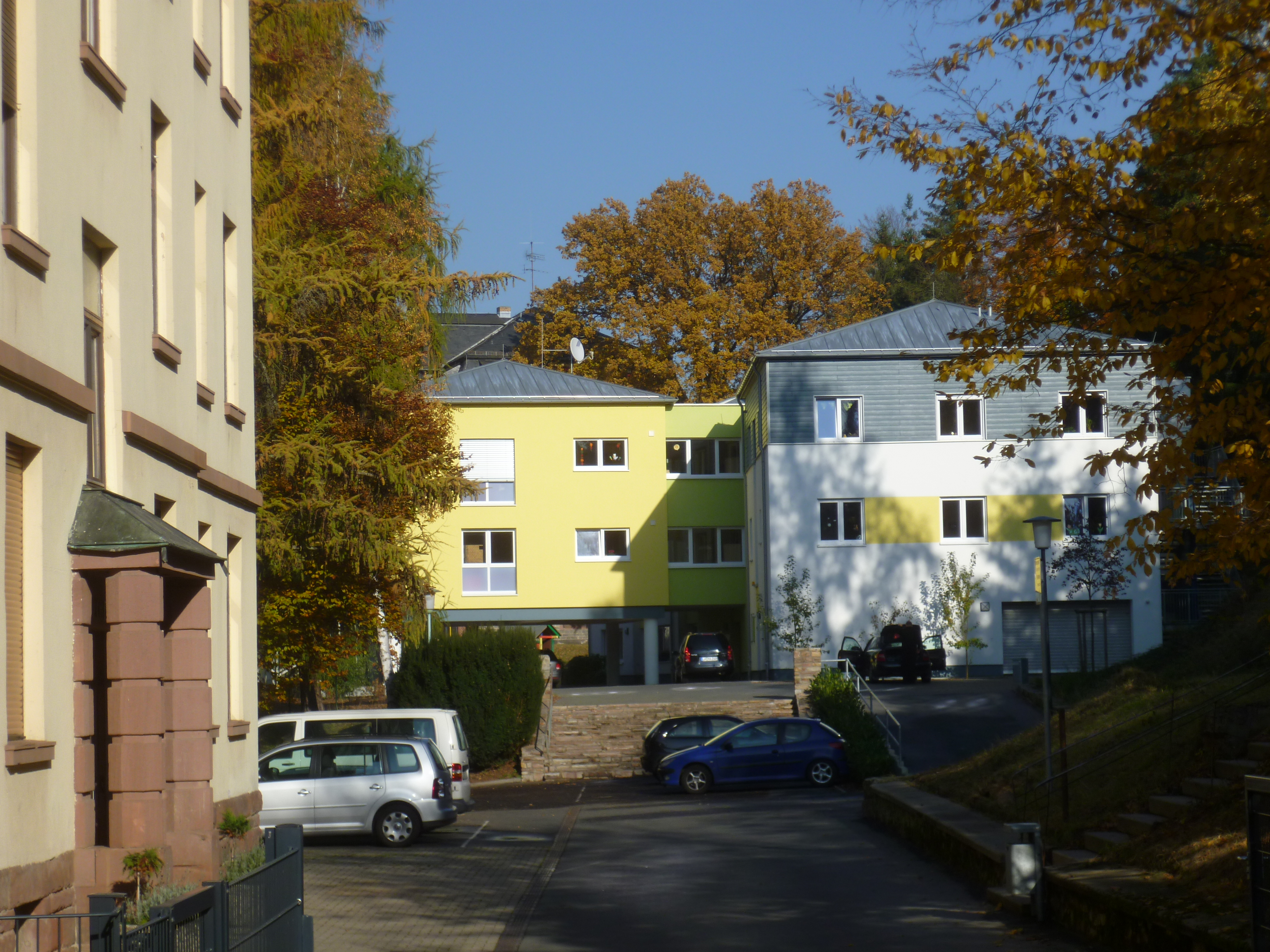
The Loni-Franz-Haus

== Organization ==
The Landeswohlfahrtsverband Hessen (LWV), as the owner of Vitos GmbH, operates Vitos Teilhabe gGmbH and the Max-Kirmsse-Schule, which evolved from Kalmenhof.

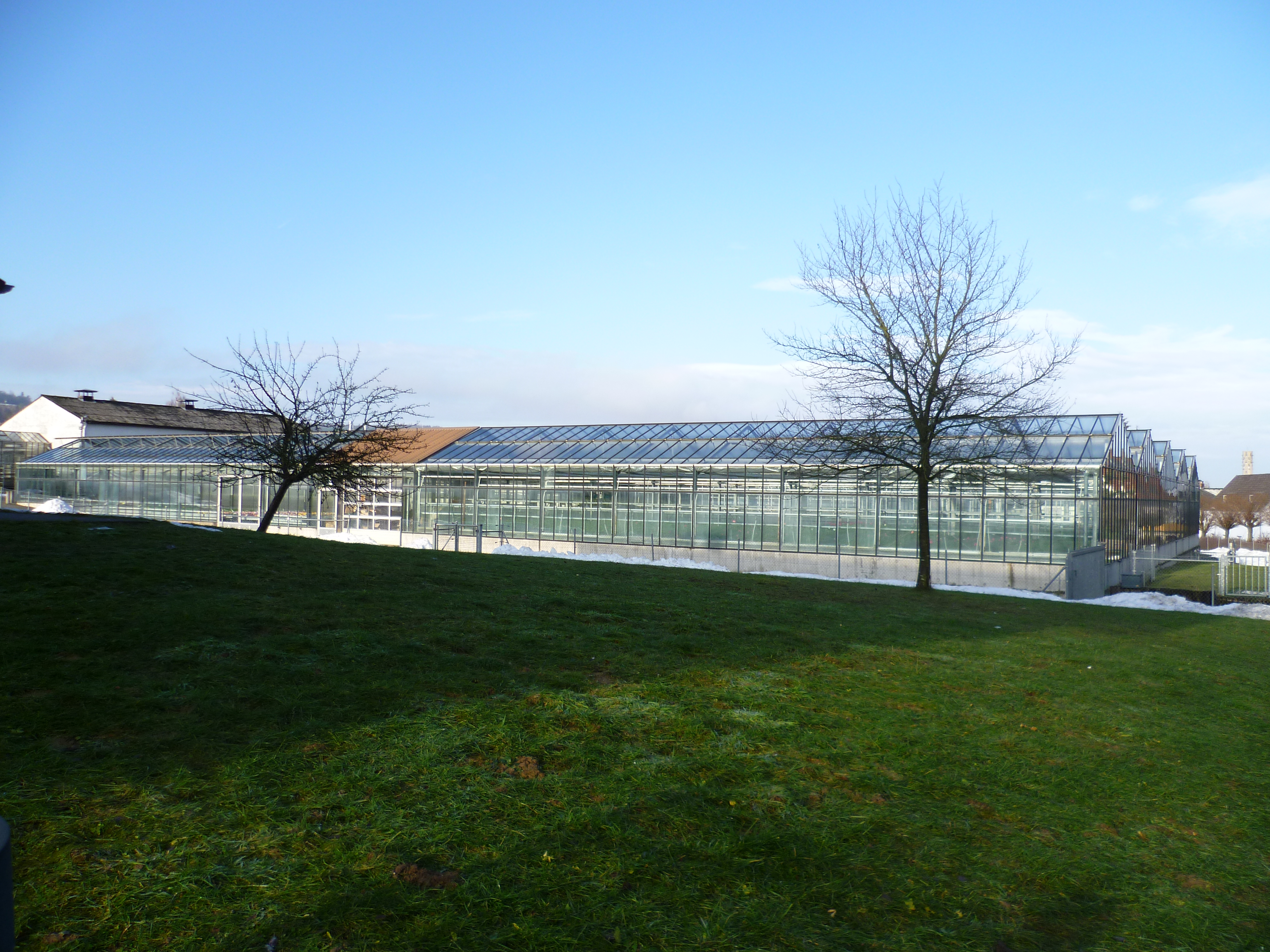
Nursery at Hofgut Gassenbach

Kalmenhof provides specialized facilities for disability and youth care, including a workshop for people with disabilities and residential units for adults and children with intellectual disabilities. Youth services offer various living arrangements, as well as inpatient and outpatient educational support. The former Social Pedagogical Center Kalmenhof now operates as Vitos Teilhabe gGmbH. As of early 2011, Vitos Kalmenhof, Idstein's largest employer, had approximately 350 staff members working in youth and disability care.

Vitos Jugendhilfe Idstein (Buchenhaus) supports around 200 children and adolescents, supplemented by outreach family assistance provided by trained social pedagogues and support for foster families for children needing long-term stable homes. Vitos Behindertenhilfe für Kinder und Jugendliche offers 45 inpatient places for school-age children, housed in the Rosenhaus and Loni-Franz-Haus.

Vitos Behindertenhilfe für Erwachsene Idstein (Rudolph-Ehlers-Haus) provides up to 74 places with living and working opportunities for individuals with intellectual and multiple disabilities. The country house accommodates individuals with intellectual, behavioral, and multiple disabilities. Smaller residential groups are also located in surrounding communities. In 2010, 38 individuals with intellectual disabilities worked at the nursery on Grunerstraße.

== History ==
=== Origins of Kalmenhof ===
The origins of Kalmenhof lie with the Stockheimer Hof. The associated estate was established in 1350. The Lords of Stockheim, burgmann of the Counts of Nassau-Wiesbaden, built the still-existing main house of the estate in 1599. In 1661, much of the Stockheim estate was sold and merged with Hofgut Gassenbach. During the Thirty Years' War, the Stockheimer Hof served as a refuge for displaced persons. The Stockheim family line ended in 1702. A series of owners followed, including Privy Councilor Johann Henrich von Kalm (died 1776), who acquired the estate in 1768, giving rise to the name Kalmenhof.

From 1849 to 1877, Kalmenhof was associated with a pedagogical institution when Georg Philipp Weldert's preschool (1795–1863) was located there. It later moved to a building on Zuckerberg.

=== Founding of the "Idiotenanstalt Idstein" ===
The latter half of the 19th century saw significant social upheaval. Due to rural exodus, the population of Frankfurt grew by 355%, Wiesbaden by 207%, and Offenbach by 148% between 1871 and 1910. For working-class families living at subsistence levels, placing disabled family members in an institution was a significant relief, especially after the 1892 amendment to the Residence Relief Law, which allowed the Wiesbaden District Association to cover accommodation costs.

The decisive impetus for establishing another "Idioten-Anstalt" in the Frankfurt area came from the fifth Conference for Idiot Care held from September 16–18, 1886, in Frankfurt. Although Kalmenhof was not on the agenda, its founding was likely discussed extensively on the sidelines.

The motives for establishing the facility in Idstein are unclear, but it was common to locate such institutions in rural areas, where residents' labor could be utilized more effectively, and their "confinement" was less visible to urban populations.

Key initiators were the Protestant pastor Rudolph Ehlers, the Jewish banker and philanthropist Charles Hallgarten, and Frankfurt city councilor Karl Flesch, all driven by social commitment. Ehlers had a daughter with intellectual disabilities.

Other contributors included entrepreneurs Hermann Sonnenberg and Carl Bolongaro, architect and local politician Konrad Steinbrinck, August Lotz (a former assistant to Heinrich Hoffmann), state director Otto Sartorius (the only non-Frankfurter), and Frankfurt police president August von Hergenhahn. The latter is mentioned alongside Ehlers and Hallgarten on the founders' relief, though his role was less significant.

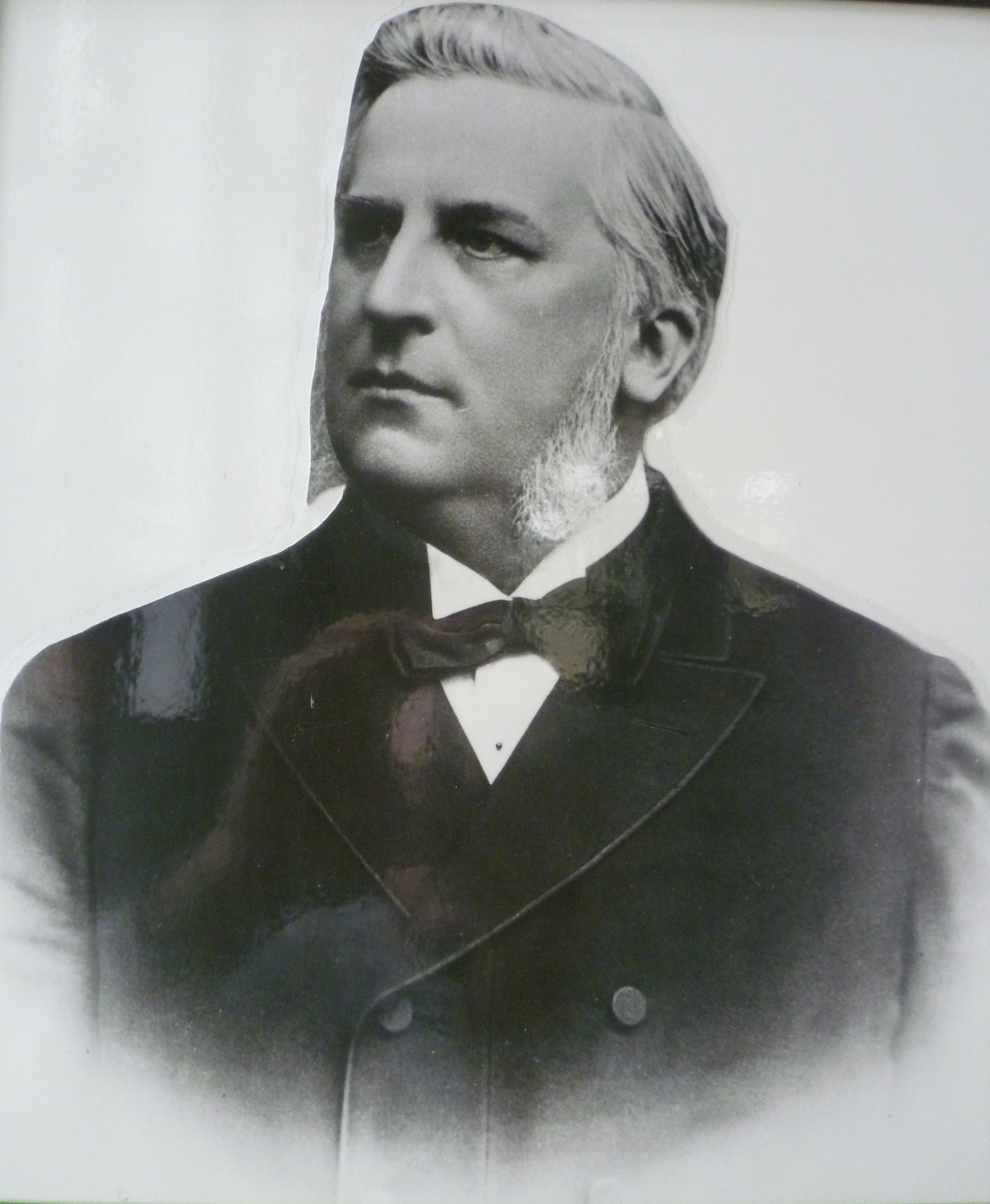
Rudolph Ehlers (1834–1908)

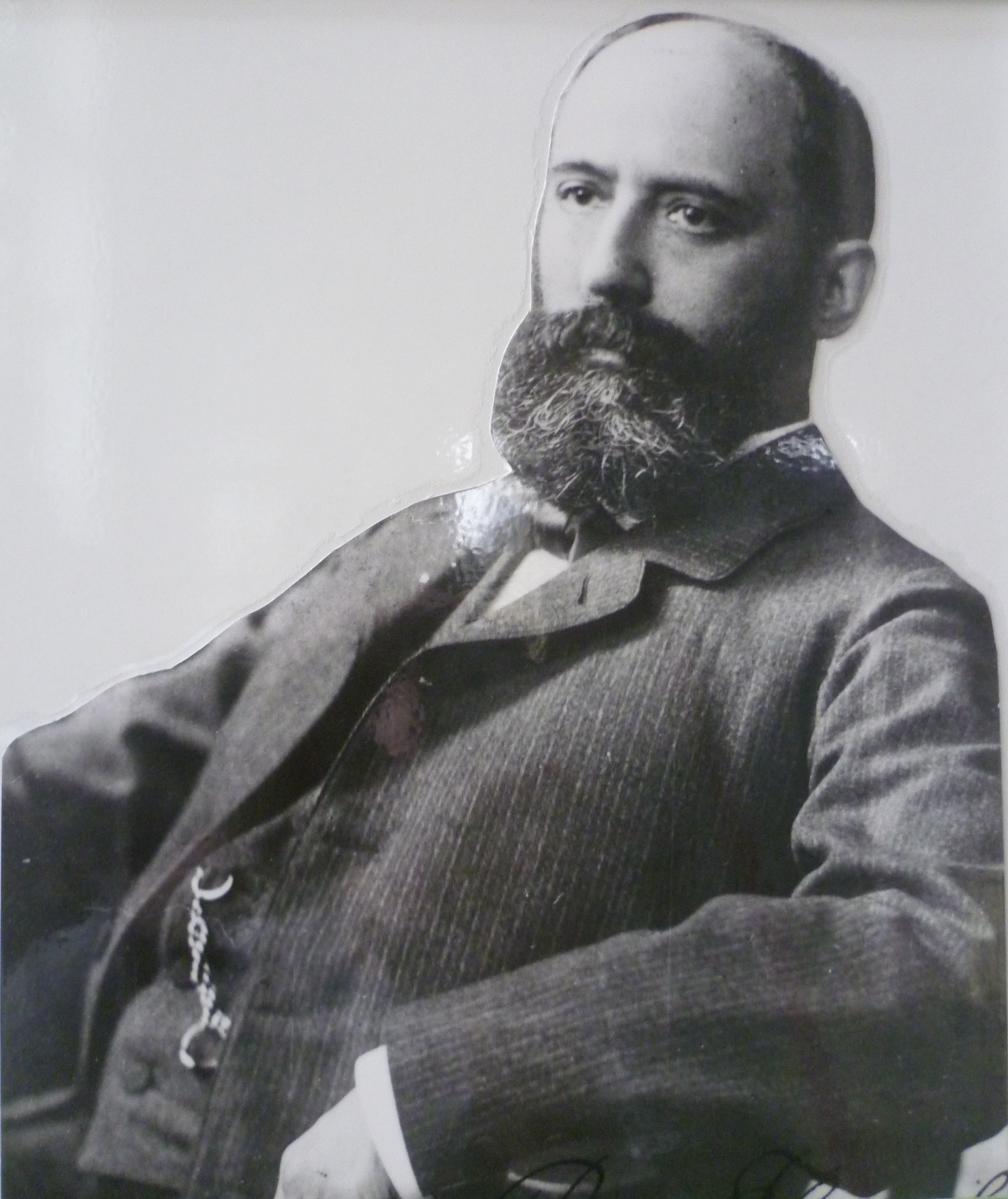
Karl Flesch (1853–1915)

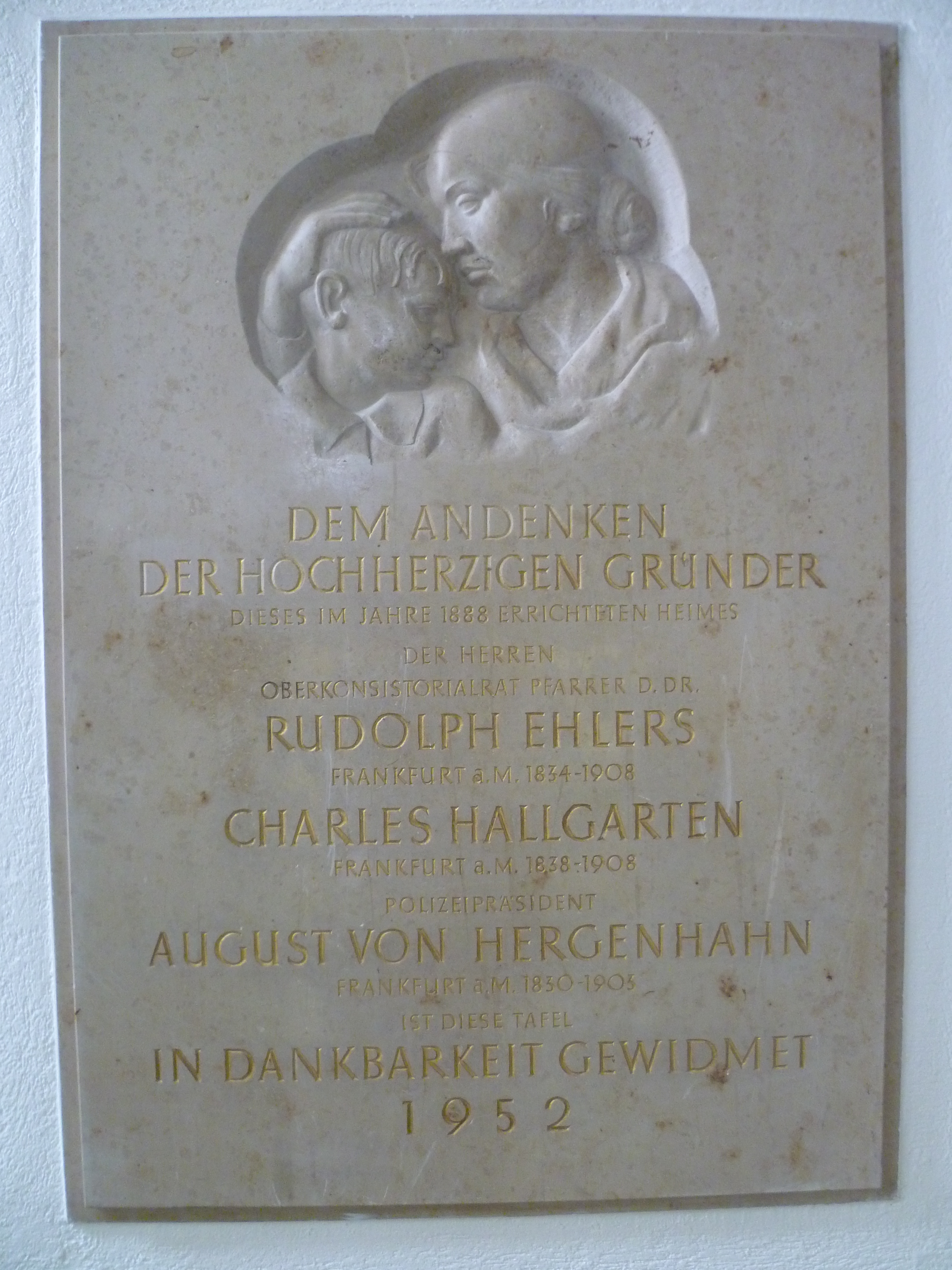
Founders' relief from 1952

The Association for the Idiotenanstalt Idstein was founded on April 30, 1888, with the primary goal of "establishing and maintaining an institution where idiots (the feeble-minded, imbeciles, and epileptics) of both sexes, all ages, and religious denominations are cared for and, as far as possible, trained for employability or appropriately occupied." The founders set high standards for educators and directors: "They should demonstrate, through their treatment of residents, that they have internalized the spirit of humane, religious, and moral education."

On May 1, the Hallgarten couple signed the purchase agreement for the Kalmenhof estate. The official opening followed on October 7, 1888, with 12 to 18 children under the direction of teacher Johann Jacob Schwenk. The manor house, the core of the institution, was in disrepair and required renovation for its new purpose. The non-profit association was established independently of state or church authorities, making Kalmenhof an interdenominational, reform-oriented institution. Until the 1930s, up to 20% of residents were Jewish and received appropriate education and care.

=== Expansion ===
The initial capacity of Kalmenhof, primarily occupied by children, quickly proved insufficient. The first expansion, the girls' house (also called Birkenhaus), designed and built by Konrad Steinbrinck, was inaugurated in June 1891 and was nearly fully occupied by late 1892. The boys' house, Tannenhaus, begun in 1893, was completed in September 1894. The Stockheimer Hof thereafter primarily served as the director's residence.

Initially, residents were only introduced to vocational preparatory manual work. In 1894, a trained brushmaker was hired for specialized vocational training, and a special school was established in 1889. Ten years after its founding, Kalmenhof housed 114 residents. Three years later, a pension house for residents from wealthier families was inaugurated, followed by the old-age home In der Ritzbach near Idstein's train station in June 1905, located about 800 meters from the main site for non-educable adult residents. A gymnasium was built in 1907.

The year 1908 was challenging, as both Ehlers and Hallgarten died in quick succession. Hallgarten's son, Fritz Hallgarten, took over as treasurer, and Adolf Varrentrapp succeeded Ehlers as board chairman.

In 1910, Max Kirmsse joined as a special education teacher and worked at Kalmenhof until 1922, later lending his name to the Max-Kirmsse-Schule in Idstein. In 1911, Idstein's first Red Cross sanitary unit was formed, primarily consisting of Kalmenhof staff.

Expansion concluded temporarily in 1913 with the inauguration of the women's old-age home and the central operational building. By then, Kalmenhof had seven workshops where nine master craftsmen trained 41 residents.

Financially, the association relied on state care payments, self-produced goods, and donations.

=== World War I ===
During World War I, Kalmenhof lost ten staff members to conscription. The staffing shortage was exacerbated by the arrest of two South African-born employees, considered enemy nationals due to their British citizenship. They were later naturalized as Germans after proving early relocation to Germany, but were then conscripted, leaving the institution understaffed. Restructuring was necessary to maintain school and training operations, with increased hiring of female staff and the use of apprentice residents as assistant caregivers.

The supply situation was problematic during the war years. While Kalmenhof's income stagnated, food costs doubled, leading to malnutrition among residents. By late 1917, 52 residents had been conscripted, ten of whom received the Iron Cross, five were killed, and many were wounded.

=== Inflation and reconstruction ===
Due to the economic situation and hyperinflation, Kalmenhof's financial situation was dire. A fire in February 1922 severely damaged the boys' house, pushing the association to the brink of ruin as financial backers lost their resources. Unable to manage privately, the board joined the Association of Frankfurt and Surrounding Hospitals in 1921. With support from Idstein's residents, the boys' house was rebuilt. Director Schwenk died in 1922, succeeded by Emil Spornhauer.

With resident numbers dropping to 250–300 in 1923, the institution, renamed Heilerziehungsanstalt Calmenhof zu Idstein im Taunus, hit its lowest point. Economic stabilization improved its financial situation. Kalmenhof significantly shaped Idstein's life, as noted by the commander of the British 1st Battalion of the Royal Ulster Rifles, stationed in Idstein for ten months in 1926: "The chief local industry was, apparently, breeding lunatics and keeping asylums for them."

In 1927, under the medical direction of Fritz Klein, a new 26-bed hospital began operations as a medical observation station and short-term patient accommodation. In 1926, a building complex from a bankrupt neighboring leather factory was purchased and converted into an apprentice home, becoming the main building. This increased capacity by 200 places by 1929. Architect Ludwig Minner oversaw this conversion and the 1930 renovation of the nearby laundry building.

In 1930, Kalmenhof acquired the nearby Hofgut Gassenbach from the city of Frankfurt, enhancing its economic base with 700 hectares of farmland.

=== Kalmenhof during the Nazi era ===
==== Takeover and use as a lazaret ====
On April 4, 1933, shortly after the Nazi seizure of power, Director Spornhauer was forcibly removed by an SS unit, according to eyewitnesses. The NSDAP Hesse-Nassau-South appointed Ernst Müller as interim director. The administrative board resisted the Nazi takeover, resigning collectively on August 1, 1933. Regional councilor Fritz Bernotat, responsible for institutional affairs at the Wiesbaden District Association, assumed chairmanship of the board, marking the Gleichschaltung and loss of Kalmenhof's independent status.

This leadership change brought a shift in resident treatment. Pedagogical goals were abandoned in favor of cost-efficient mass accommodation. Operating costs were reduced to maximize occupancy, dropping apprentice numbers from 270 in 1933 to 37 by 1937, while total residents increased from 630 to nearly 1,000.

The principle of interdenominationalism was also abandoned. In 1932, about 150 Jewish residents were supported by a Jewish teacher, assistant, and cook, but by 1936, this support ceased, and Jewish resident numbers dropped to around 60.

With the start of World War II, a 500-bed Wehrmacht lazaret was established at Kalmenhof in 1939. Kalmenhof was required to provide accommodations, laundry, and provisions. To make space, many residents were transferred to other institutions, reducing occupancy to 350. In 1940, the lazaret closed, and a 600-man Wehrmacht signal unit was stationed there, also supported by Kalmenhof. In 1941, a lazaret was re-established, initially with 300 beds, expanding to 1,300 by the war's end. The Wehrmacht used all buildings except the external old-age home, and the 350 residents were tasked with maintaining the facility, leaving little room for pedagogical work. Due to chaotic conditions, Müller resigned in 1941, volunteering for service "in the East." Wilhelm Großmann, previously an office manager and accountant, took over.

==== Forced sterilizations, intermediate facility, and killings ====
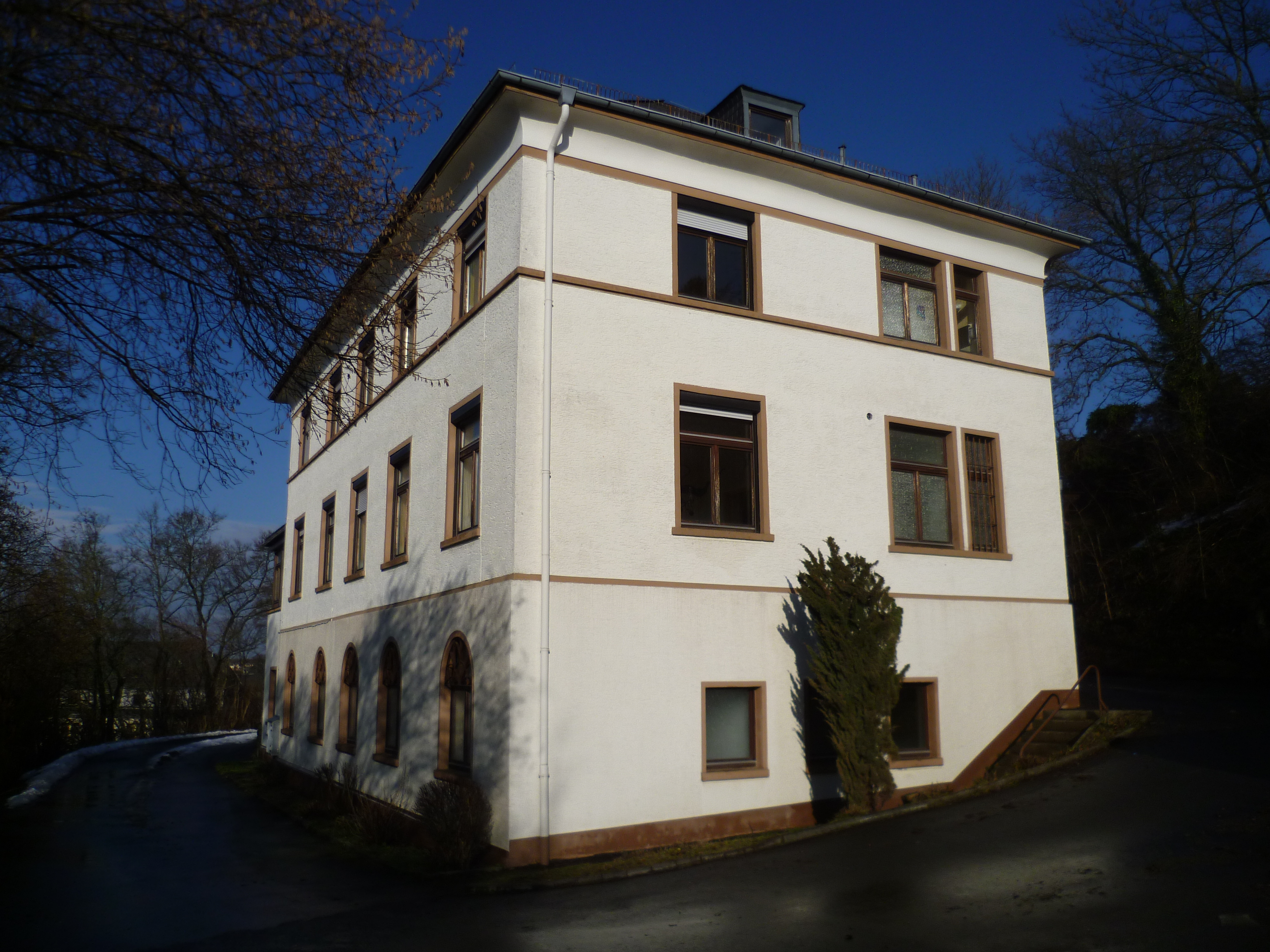
The former hospital, located somewhat apart

Documenting Nazi euthanasia murders at Kalmenhof is challenging due to the destruction of records at the war's end. Estimates suggest between 600 and 1,000 deaths. The first killings began in late 1939.

From 1934, at least 216 residents underwent forced sterilization under the Law for the Prevention of Hereditarily Diseased Offspring. From August 1, 1938, to December 1939, Hans Bodo Gorgaß was the chief physician, later responsible for thousands of deaths elsewhere and described as a "butcher" by peers involved in the extermination program. On June 28, 1939, Mathilde Weber joined as an assistant physician, taking over medical leadership after Gorgaß's departure until May 10, 1944, when she left due to tuberculosis. Hermann Wesse, previously at Bedburg-Hau, Andernach, Waldniel, and Uchtspringe, succeeded her until the war's end, with Weber briefly substituting in December 1944 and January 1945.

===== Kalmenhof as an intermediate facility =====
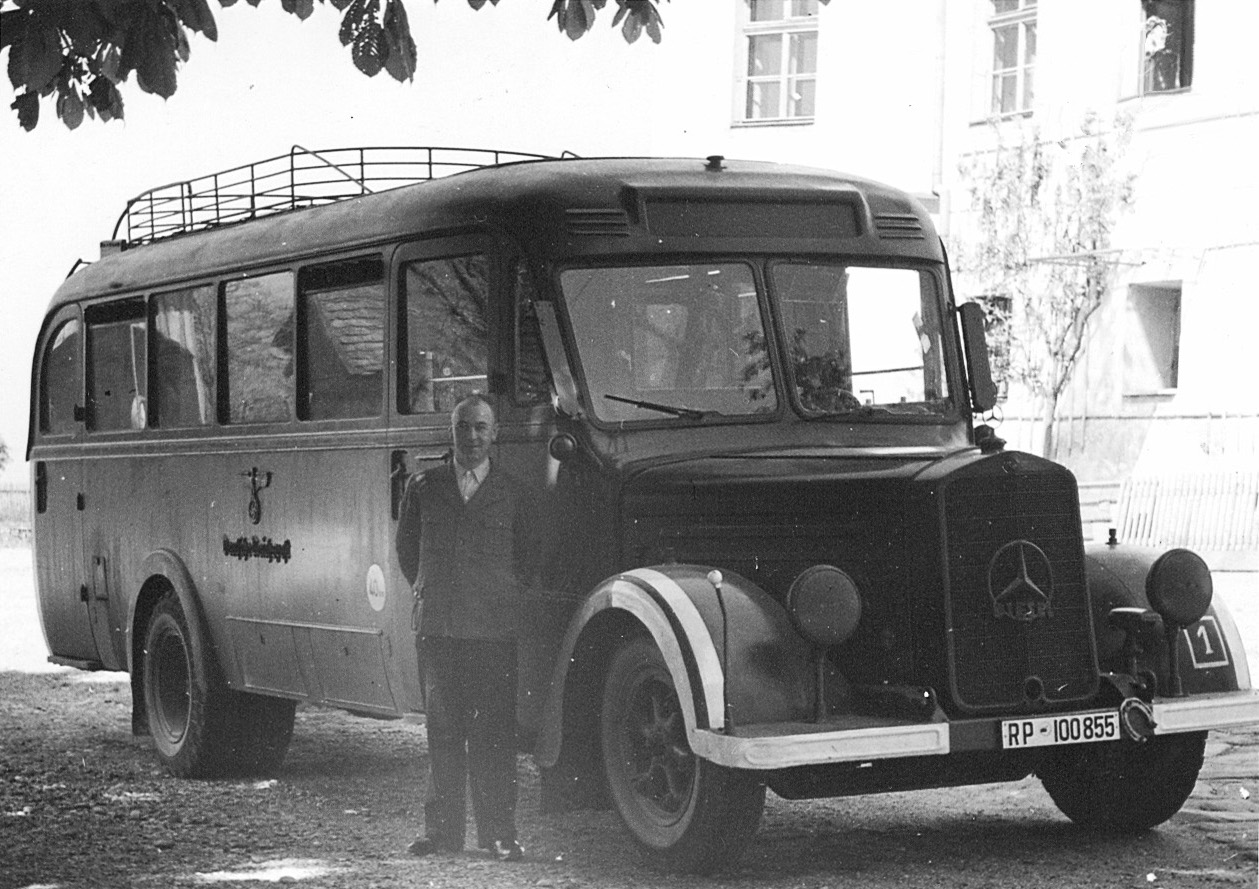
Gekrat bus

Under Aktion T4, several care facilities were converted into killing centers where "useless eaters" were mass-murdered, including by gassing. Kalmenhof served as an intermediate facility for the Hadamar Euthanasia Centre, alongside Andernach, Eichberg, Scheuern, and Weilmünster. Hadamar began killings in January 1941. Intermediate facilities temporarily housed victims destined for Hadamar to ensure only those immediately killable were delivered. Transfers occurred daily via Gekrat buses, except on weekends. Victims were housed on straw beds in the gymnasium or later in the old-age home's basement, including political prisoners, communists, and anarchists labeled as mentally ill or life unworthy of life.

From 1940, selection forms were distributed at Kalmenhof, sent to the Reich Committee for the Scientific Registration of Hereditary and Congenital Severe Disorders, which decided life or death. Based on these forms, 232 regular residents were transported to Hadamar in five shipments and gassed shortly after arrival. The longest-serving resident had lived at Kalmenhof for 40 years. The number of victims passing through Kalmenhof en route to Hadamar is untraceable, though records from other institutions note specific transports, such as 136 people from Gütersloh on July 9, 1941, or multiple transports from Kloster Haina. Großmann described it as "a constant coming and going of transfers."

On August 24, 1941, Adolf Hitler ordered the cessation of Aktion T4's "adult euthanasia" in the six killing centers due to public protests, but children's euthanasia continued, as did decentralized killings of disabled adults. The murders shifted fully to Kalmenhof, with significant bureaucratic efforts to give the appearance of legality.

===== Killings of "life unworthy of life" at Kalmenhof =====
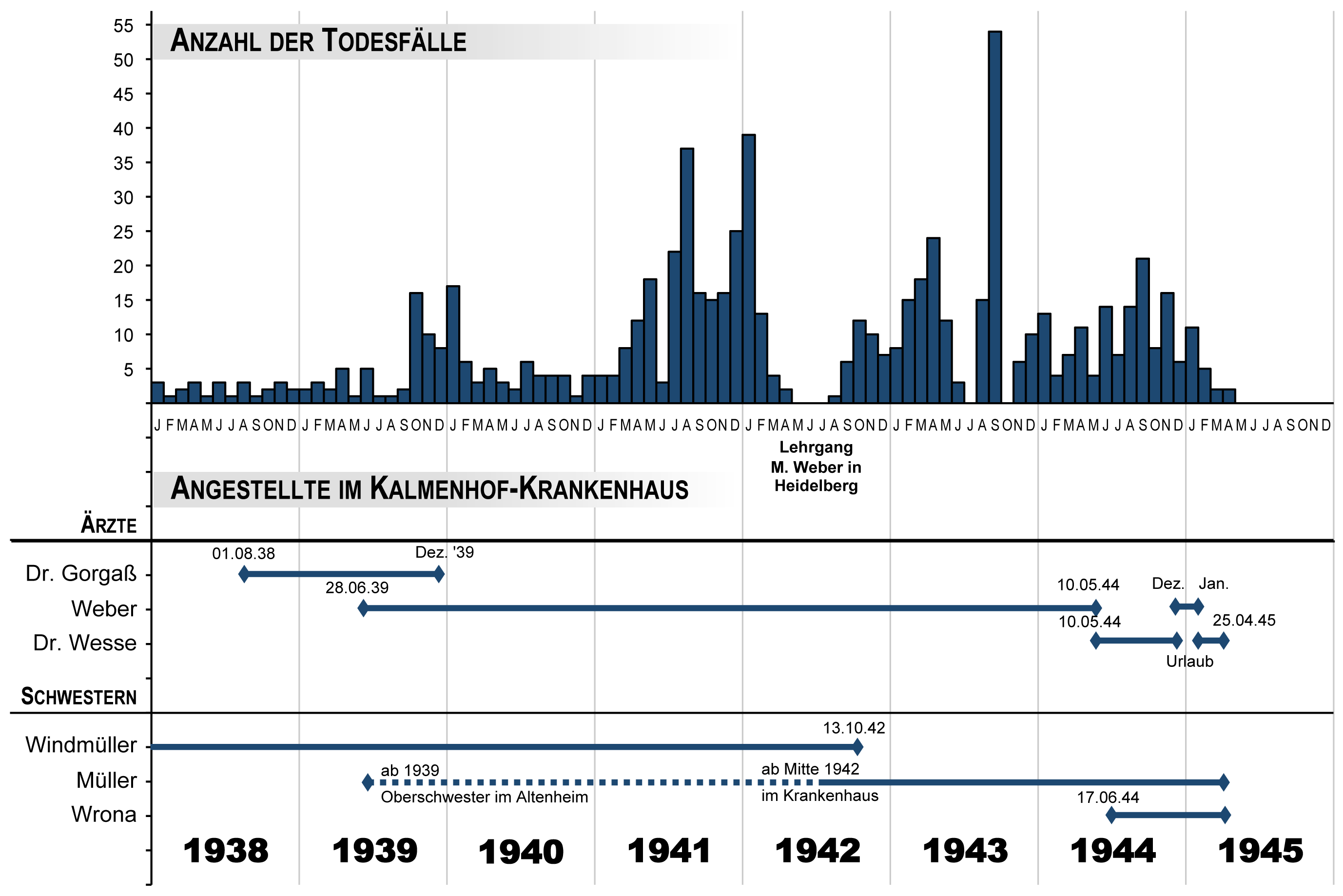
Overview of documented deaths at Kalmenhof during the Nazi era

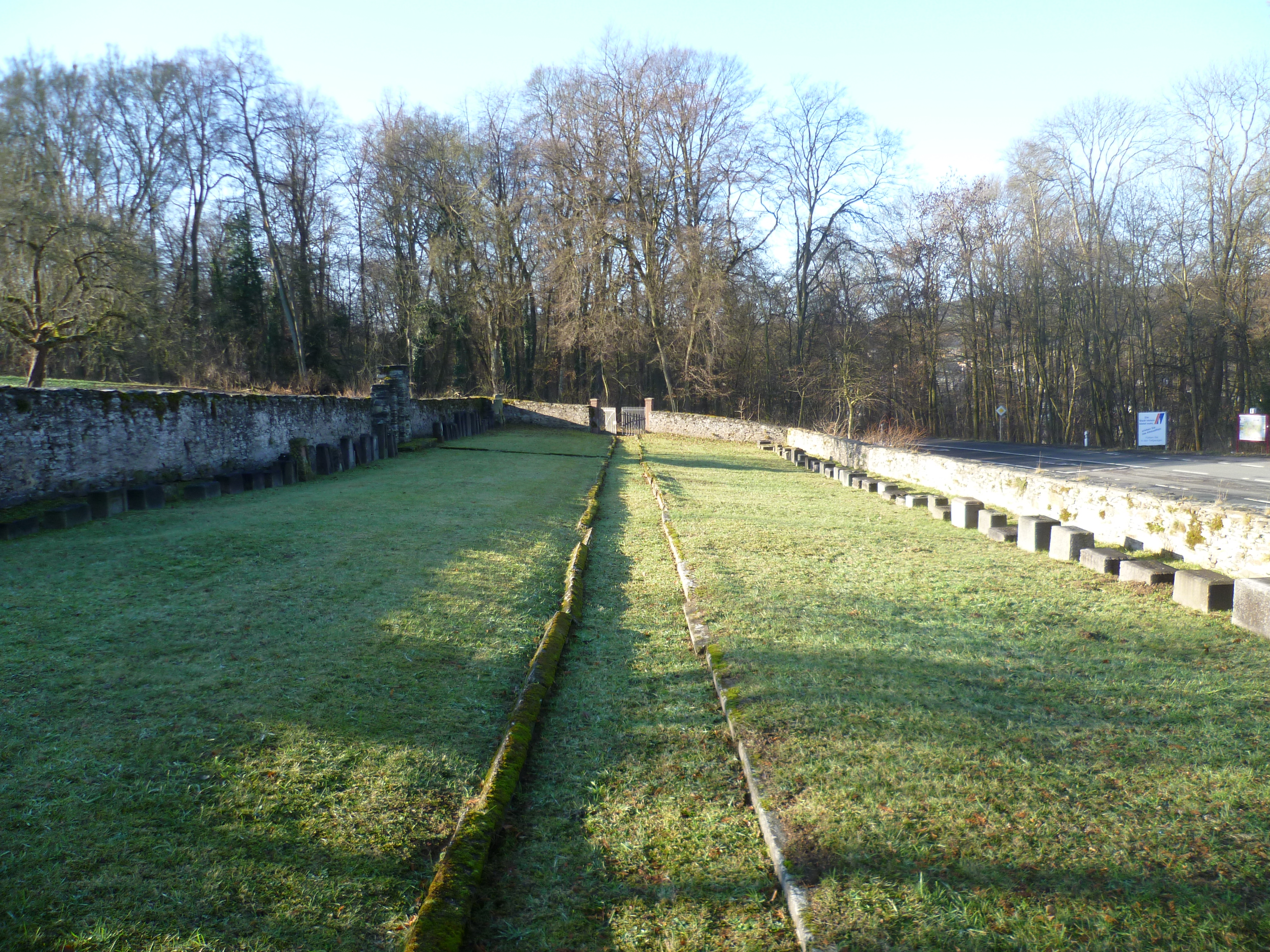
Jewish Cemetery in Idstein

With the halt of Hadamar transports, a children's ward was established on the second and third floors of Kalmenhof's hospital. Killings were primarily by poisoning with medication or deliberate starvation. Victims included children and adolescents with intellectual disabilities, epilepsy, "mongoloids," "idiots," "imbeciles," and those deemed work-shy or asocial by Nazi standards. Most victims died within days of arriving, while regular residents, useful for Kalmenhof's operations, lazaret, and Hofgut Gassenbach, were less frequently targeted. The Reich Committee in Berlin formally authorized killings based on local doctors' assessments of utility and educability. Doctors could delay killings for authorized children, holding final decision-making power, contrary to their later claims of being mere order-takers. Staff received a bonus of 5.00 RM, later 2.50 RM, per "death."

As the municipal cemetery could not accommodate Kalmenhof's numerous deaths, victims were buried at the Jewish cemetery, purchased in 1942, from February to October 1942. When it became insufficient, a cemetery was registered on farmland near the hospital, away from the town center. Burials were conducted discreetly, often as simple interments using a reusable folding coffin. Multiple bodies were often buried in a single grave, marked only by numbered metal crosses without names.

Protestant pastor Boecker, based in Idstein from 1932 to 1947, noted in the church register: "... death now reigns at Kalmenhof."

Notably, no deaths occurred during Weber's multi-week illness-related absence or her six-week training trip to Heidelberg, where she visited psychiatrist Carl Schneider, a key figure in Nazi medical crimes. Toward the end of her tenure, Weber requested no further transports due to her illness. When Wesse resumed, he explicitly requested "Reich Committee children" for killing, to which Bernotat replied he should "make do with what is there." These were no longer children with disabilities but defiant or behaviorally challenging youths, whose killings Wesse then ordered.

Fritz Geisthardt noted that Kalmenhof killings occurred without "bureaucratic effort" in "wild euthanasia," but this applied to a minority of cases, mainly at the war's start and end. Victims included children who repeatedly attempted escape, subjects of human experimentation with electroshocks or hormones by Wesse, and accomplices aware of the children's ward operations. Ludwig Heinrich Lohne, a gravedigger at Kalmenhof, survived the war's end by assaulting Wesse, fleeing, and hiding in Idstein until the U.S. Army's arrival.

===== Resistance =====
There was resistance to the crimes. Caregiver Loni Franz (1905–1987), employed at the old-age home, was particularly notable. She tried to keep children away from the hospital, often unsuccessfully, but saved some by sending them to their parents or hiding them with acquaintances in Idstein. She also arranged transfers to facilities without children's wards, such as Philipp-Hospital Riedstadt or Scheuern, and alleviated suffering from lack of food, clothing, and warmth.

In her honor, a new building, the Loni-Franz-Haus, was named after her in 2009, and a street in Idstein bears her name.

===== The Kalmenhof Trial =====
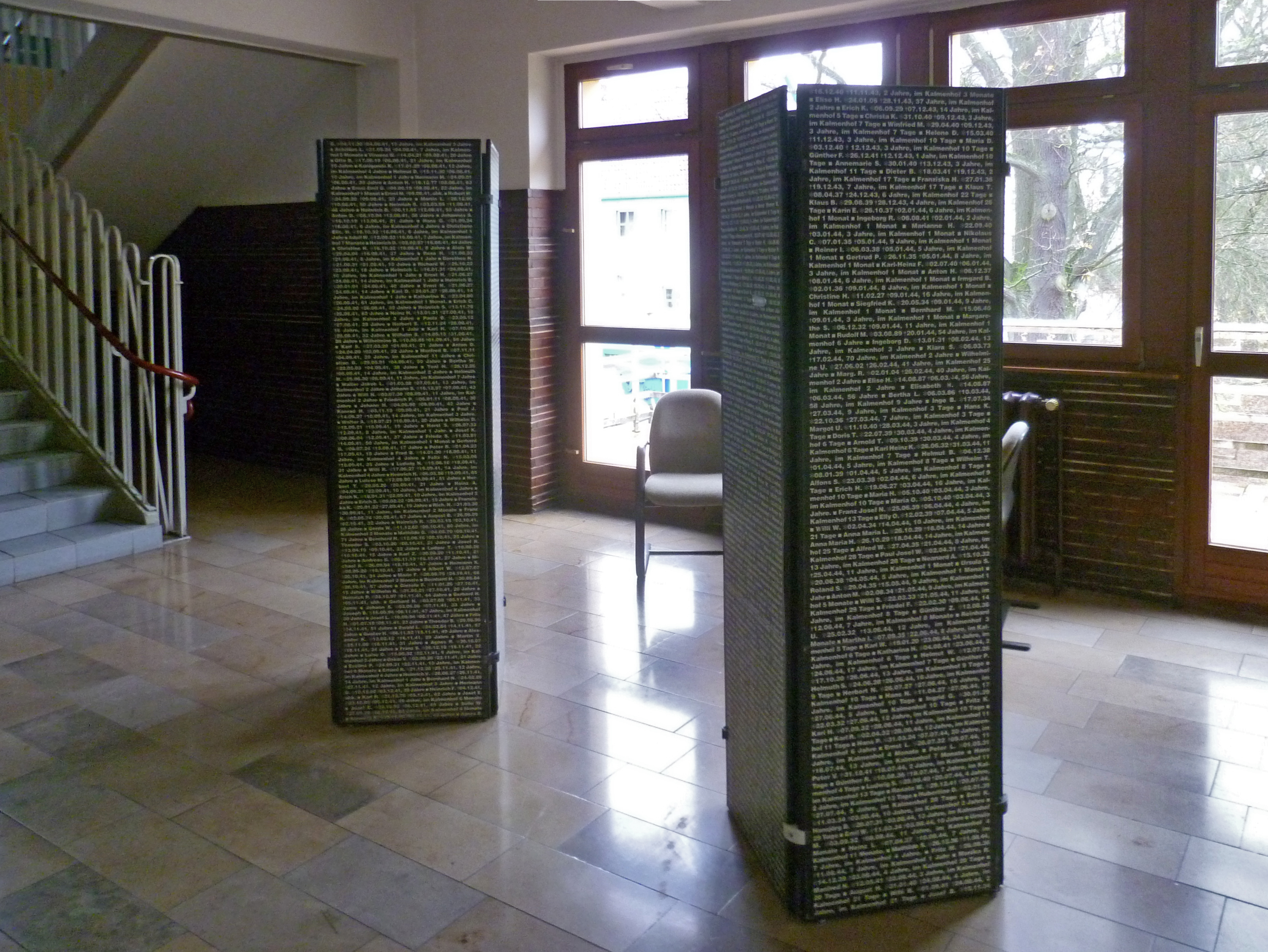
Names of the murdered, as far as traceable from records, are listed on these two pillars.

After the war, legal proceedings addressed Nazi-era crimes. In 1945, deputy director Wilhelm Großmann, physician Hermann Wesse, and nurses Änne Wrona and Maria Müller were arrested by U.S. authorities on suspicion of intentional murder. The case was transferred to German jurisdiction in March 1946. In September 1946, the Idstein Local Court issued arrest warrants for these individuals and former physician Mathilde Weber.

Following trials at the Frankfurt Regional Court and appeals at the Frankfurt Higher Regional Court, the following verdicts were issued:

- Wilhelm Großmann: Four years and six months imprisonment; he did not serve due to a pardon supported by the Idstein magistrate.
- Hermann Wesse: Initially sentenced to death, his sentence was commuted to life imprisonment in 1949 by the Düsseldorf Regional Court after the abolition of the death penalty in Germany. His conviction was supported by detailed witness testimonies regarding the deaths of "physically and mentally healthy" Ruth Pappenheimer (with a Jewish father), 15-year-old Karl-Heinz Zey from Langendernbach, 14-year-old Georg Rettig, and 23-year-old Margarethe Schmidt. His sentence was lifted in 1968, making him the only involved physician to serve a lengthy term.
- Mathilde Weber: Three years and six months in prison; initially sentenced to death, her sentence was reduced following a petition and Idstein magistrate support. After serving two-thirds, the remainder was pardoned. She lived near Kalmenhof until 1994.
- Nurse Änne Wrona (head nurse 1944–1945): Acquitted.
- Nurse Maria Müller: Escaped prosecution and was never found, though she confessed to murders during U.S. military interrogations.
- Fritz Bernotat, chairman of the Kalmenhof association, died in 1951 under a false name near Fulda, remaining unprosecuted.
- Head teacher Link, a Kalmenhof educator, poisoned his wife and committed suicide after the U.S. Army's arrival.

=== Lazaret and refugee camp ===
With the U.S. Army's arrival in Idstein on March 28, 1945, the occupation authorities took over Kalmenhof. The lazaret continued treating wounded soldiers until its closure in 1946. Kalmenhof housed evacuees from air war-damaged cities like Darmstadt and Frankfurt, and from December 1945, expellees from former eastern territories. Space was limited, and food and fuel shortages were severe, particularly during the Hunger Winter of 1946/47, when residents burned furniture to avoid freezing. Emil Spornhauer resumed leadership in 1945, briefly preceded by Max Kirmsse as interim director. In 1946, with an occupancy of about 800, approximately 1,100 admissions and discharges were recorded.

=== Post-war period to 1970 ===
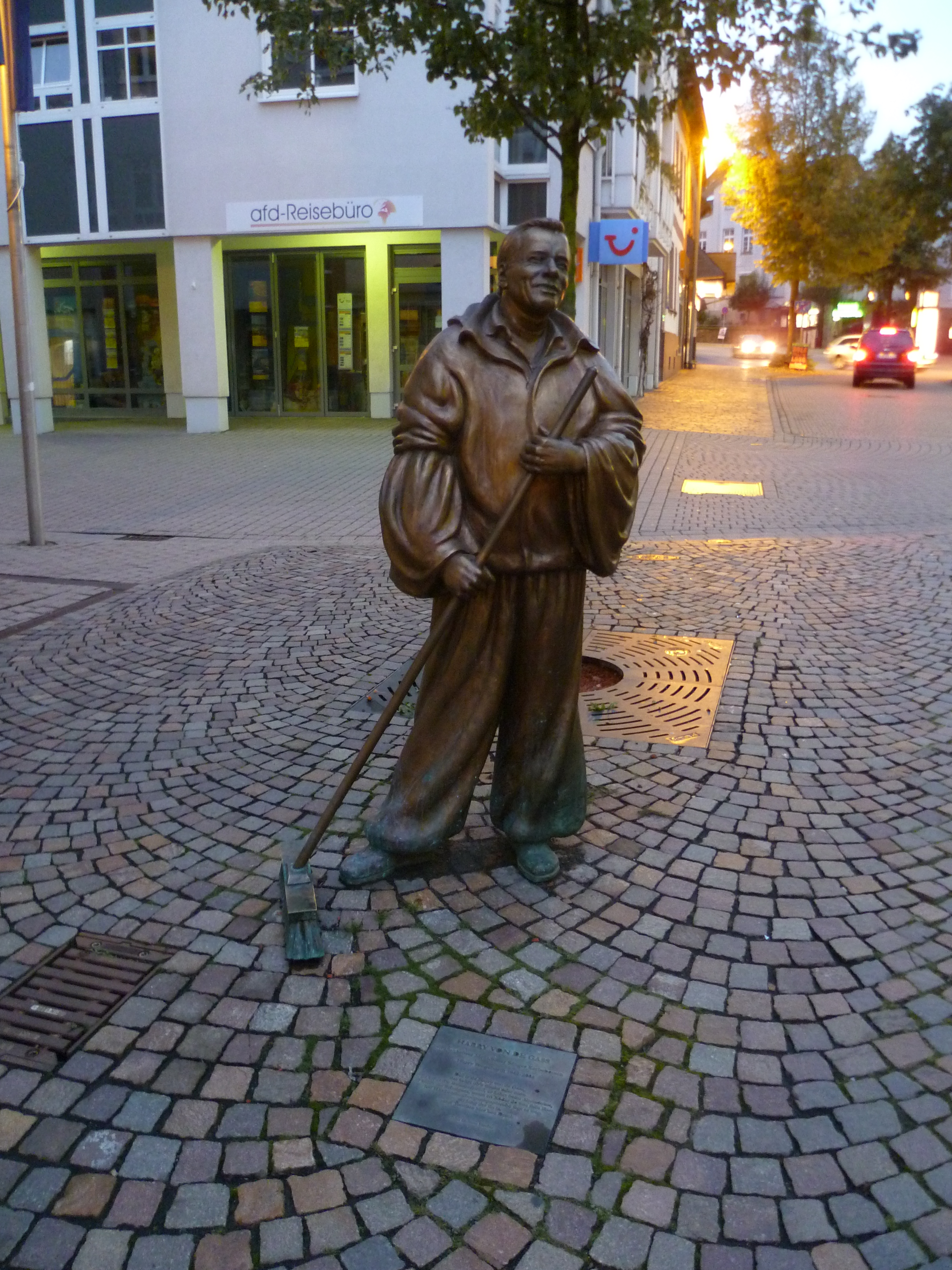
Memorial for Harry von de Gass in Idstein's pedestrian zone

In 1945, the Jewish cemetery was returned to the Jewish property administration. In 1948, the association for the care institution dissolved, and the Wiesbaden District Association took over. Ernst Ilge succeeded Spornhauer as director in 1949. By 1953, occupancy exceeded 1,000 residents, including Harry von de Gass (1942–2005), who lived at Kalmenhof from 1951 and became a local character in Idstein.

The Landeswohlfahrtsverband Hessen (LWV) was founded in 1953 and became Kalmenhof's operator. In 1954, a new special school building marked the beginning of separating the school from Kalmenhof, culminating in the establishment of the Max-Kirmsse-Schule in 1971. Kalmenhof reached its peak occupancy of 1,100 in 1954. From 1957 to 1971, new constructions and expansions accommodated the growing number of residents and differentiated learning groups by disability type. The Landhaus at Hofgut Gassenbach was built in 1966.

==== Abuse ====
During the 1950s and 1960s, severe abuse cases occurred under director Ernst Ilge, who maintained a dictatorial leadership style, and Alfred Göschl, employed from March 1963. Documented abuses included corruption, sexual abuse, and harsh punishments like withholding pocket money or food, beatings, canings, restraints, and confinement.

Volker was already asleep when the light in the dormitory was suddenly switched on in the middle of the night. An educator, feared by many children, entered and stood before the nearest bed. "Get up!" The boy, named Heinz, hadn't yet risen when a slap hit his face. "Can't you move faster?" Heinz raised both hands like a shield over his head and remained silent. "Anyone else want a goodnight kiss?"

— Peter Wensierski, Schläge im Namen des Herrn

These incidents ended only after a November 15, 1969, broadcast on Hessischer Rundfunk's youth radio by journalist Ulrike Holler exposed Kalmenhof's conditions, followed by a November 17 article in Der Spiegel. This coincided with the home campaign, an APO initiative addressing intolerable conditions in German children's and youth homes. Legal complaints and discussions in the Hessian Landtag followed. On July 7, 1970, Göschl was removed and transferred to the LWV headquarters in Kassel. Investigations by the Wiesbaden public prosecutor against him for corruption and exploitation were dropped without charges. Complaints were also filed against estate manager Hofbauer and the LWV's youth welfare department for negligence, but no prosecutions followed.

Psychologist Gertrud Zovkic, employed at Kalmenhof since early 1966, played a key role in exposing these abuses. She advocated for professional educator training, opposing the institution's internally recognized training in favor of state-accredited programs at specialized schools. She encouraged some to leave Kalmenhof for formal training, earning her the label of "nest fouler." She was forcibly transferred to the LWV's Steinmühle home in Ober-Erlenbach, dissolved in 1974, and later dismissed after legal disputes. A lay court in Wiesbaden fined five educators up to 100 DM.

In 1972, coordinator Karl Reitinger noted that only four of ninety educators had pedagogical training. Many educators under Ilge had military or Nazi backgrounds and were personally loyal to him, a policy criticized by LWV representatives.

=== Addressing the past ===
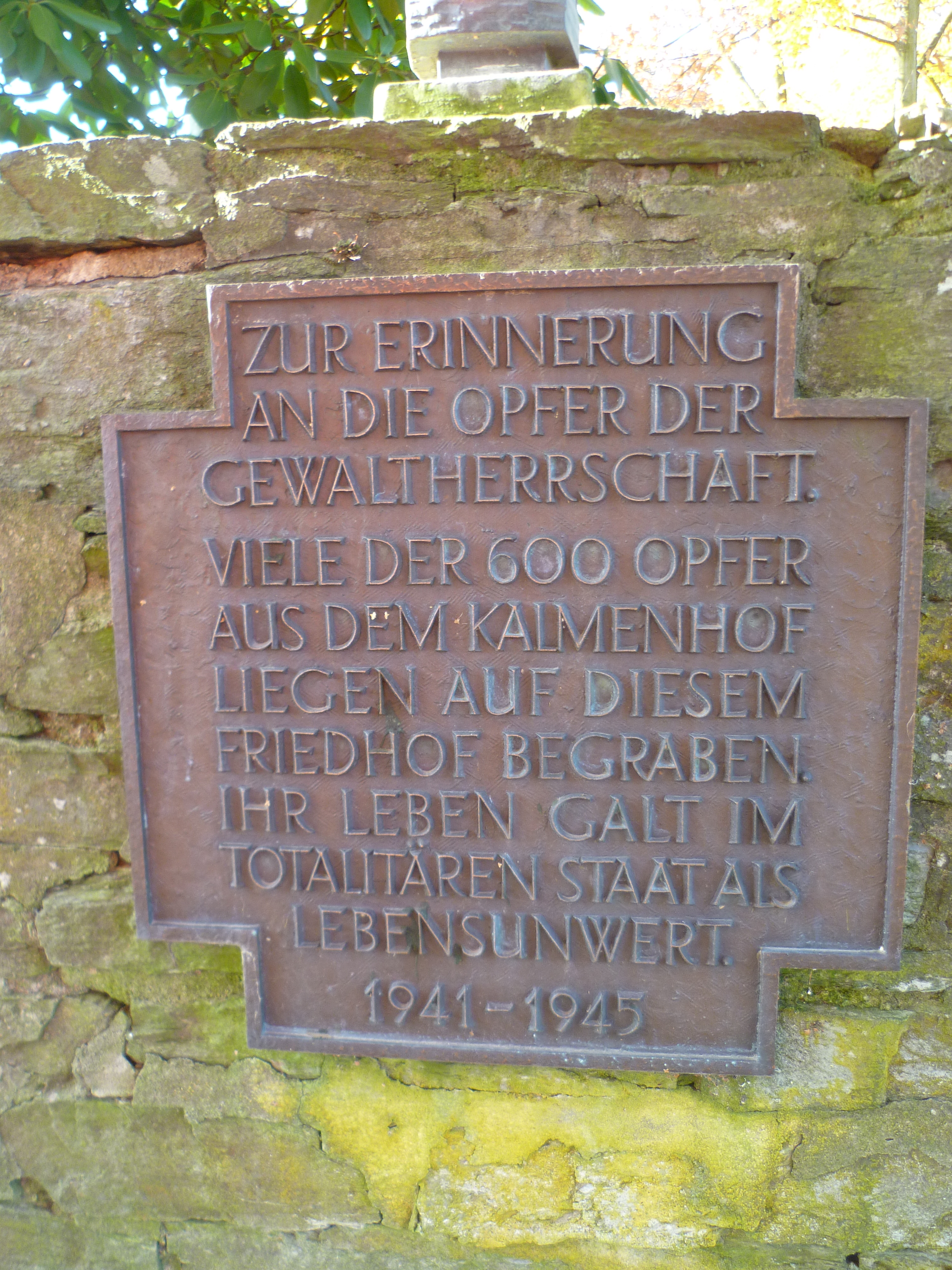
Memorial plaque at Idstein Cemetery, at the enclosure of the war graves site

Until 1961, a private annual procession led by a caregiver and a few children visited the increasingly overgrown former institutional cemetery behind the hospital, where most murdered children were buried. Georadar surveys in 2019 suggest additional graves on the institutional grounds and adjacent private property.

Public engagement with the Nazi era events began late. A school garden was established on the burial ground. In 1978, coordinator Reitinger mistakenly claimed no euthanasia murders occurred at Kalmenhof, though it served as an intermediate facility. In April 1981, Idstein youths visiting Poland met Holocaust survivor Jurek Skrzypek, who highlighted Kalmenhof's history. Pastor Siebert contacted Kalmenhof's leadership, church representatives, and Idstein's mayor, prompting the LWV to form a commission to investigate and document the crimes.

The public learned of these events through reports in the Idsteiner Zeitung and Frankfurter Rundschau. Idstein citizens engaged through exhibitions, information events, and memorial services. Dorothea Sick published initial research in 1983, with Reitinger as an informant. A memorial cross was erected at the Veitenmühlberg mass grave on Volkstrauertag 1984, and the memorial site was dedicated on May 24, 1987. A memorial plaque was installed at Idstein Cemetery's war graves site in 1987. Since 1997, the permanent exhibition Der Kalmenhof damals und heute in the main building has informed visitors about Nazi-era crimes.

On June 9, 2006, a conference publicly addressed the 1950s and 1960s abuse cases. The documentary Die Unwertigen by Renate Günther-Greene, covering both Nazi-era and later abuses, was partly filmed at Kalmenhof and screened there in June 2010.

Idstein's magistrate commissioned a Memorial for Victims of Violence and Expulsion, with the working group's first meeting on April 3, 2008. Students from Pestalozzischule Idstein contributed designs.

On March 4, 2013, ZDF aired the feature film Und alle haben geschwiegen, based on 1960s resident experiences, followed by a documentary of the same name featuring former residents' accounts of abuse at Kalmenhof.

The first stumbling stone in Frankfurt's new old town commemorates Jakob Hess, a victim of Kalmenhof's euthanasia murders.

=== Future directions ===
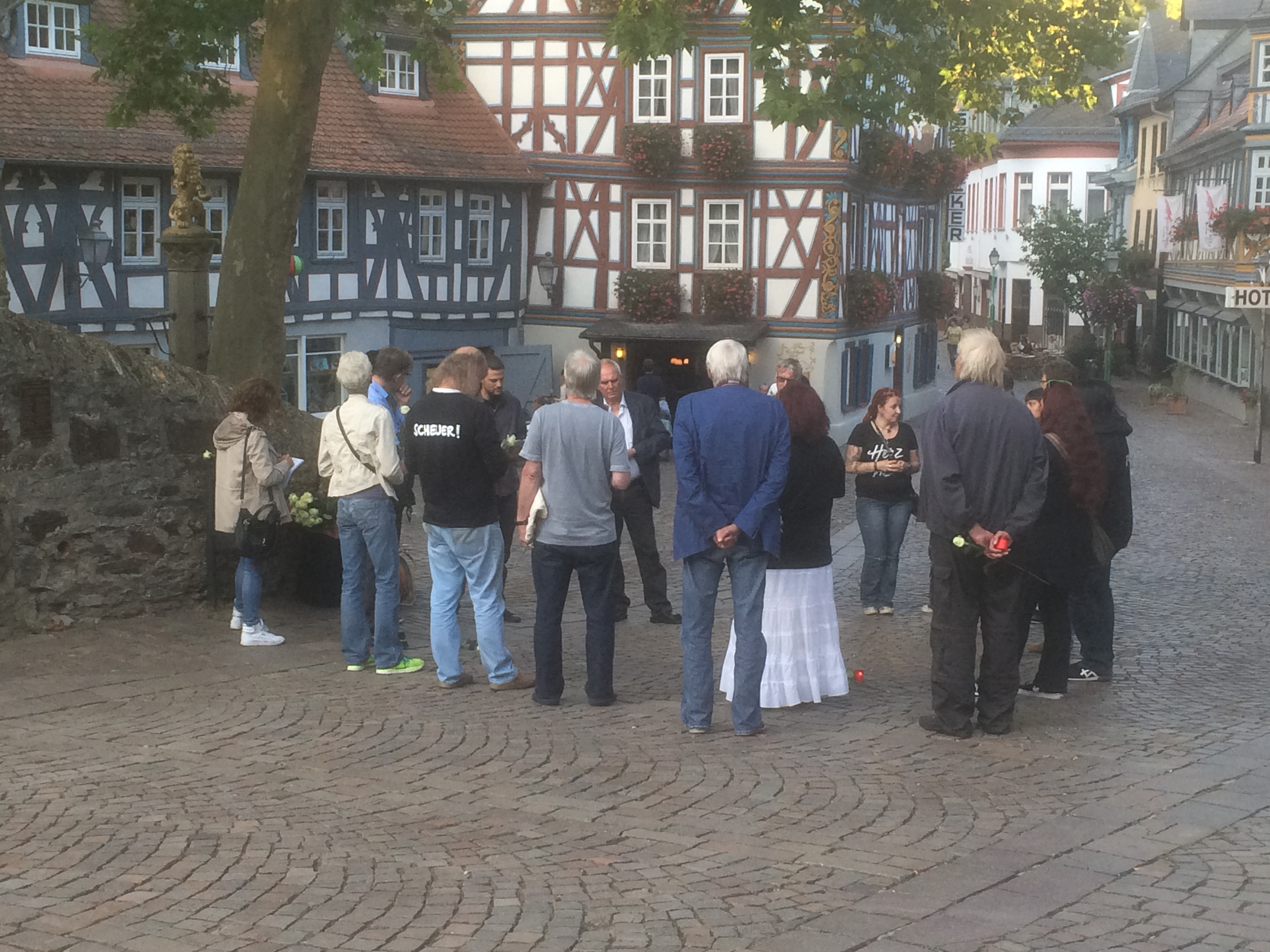
Vigil by the party Die Linke at König-Adolf-Platz in Idstein regarding the preservation of Kalmenhof's former hospital, September 29, 2016

From 1996, the LWV considered selling parts of the Kalmenhof site for development. Idstein created a development plan to secure influence over future use, focusing on preserving the Directors' Meadow as green space. The LWV challenged this plan at the Hessian Administrative Court, with proceedings ongoing in 2011.

On July 13, 2004, the Rudolph-Ehlers-Haus, replacing the Stockheimer Hof, was inaugurated under the local planning office Guckes. In 2006, the Stockheimer Hof was transferred to the Guckes planning office, ending its association with Kalmenhof.

On June 8, 2008, the Loni-Franz-Haus, an extension of the Rosenhaus, was inaugurated, also built by Guckes. A major fire, likely due to arson, damaged the nursery's storage and hall on September 10, 2011, causing approximately €50,000 in damage.

In September 2011, the University of Kassel was commissioned to research physical and psychological abuses in LWV homes during the 1950s and 1960s, led by Mechthild Bereswill (sociology) and Theresia Höynck (law).

In May 2012, most facilities of the Vitos Pedagogical-Medical Center Wabern, except its training operations, were transferred from Vitos Kurhessen to Vitos Kalmenhof, maintaining the Wabern youth services as an outpost to sharpen its youth welfare profile.

In July 2016, Vitos considered selling the former hospital and surrounding land, which is not heritage-listed.

== Notable site areas ==
Several Kalmenhof buildings are noteworthy for their age, architecture, or history.

=== Kalmenhof Cemetery ===
Initially, the first 300 victims were buried in the municipal cemetery. As it could not handle Kalmenhof's numerous deaths, the city barred further burials there. About 50 victims were buried at the Jewish cemetery, purchased in 1942, between February and October 1942. When this proved insufficient, a cemetery was registered on farmland near the hospital, away from the town center. Burials were conducted discreetly, often as simple interments using a reusable folding coffin. Multiple bodies were often buried in one grave, marked only by numbered metal crosses without names.

Post-war, there was likely little public interest in maintaining the cemetery. A 1946 inspection led by Fritz Bauer documented three burial fields in three rows with about 270 metal crosses. In 1952, during Mayor Willy Schreier's term, the "Schöne Aussicht" development area was established, with plots extending into the unsecured cemetery, where metal crosses were still visible. In 1964, the construction of a staff residence (variously called "civil servants' house" or "directors' house"), including sewer connections and access roads, led to the removal of metal crosses from the affected terrace. Expansion of the adjacent Max-Kirmsse-Schule involved blasting and earthworks, likely destroying graves. The 1987 memorial is too small to cover the entire cemetery area. Historian Christoph Schneider suggests the burial fields were deliberately forgotten in the 1950s.

==== Veitenmühlberg Memorial ====
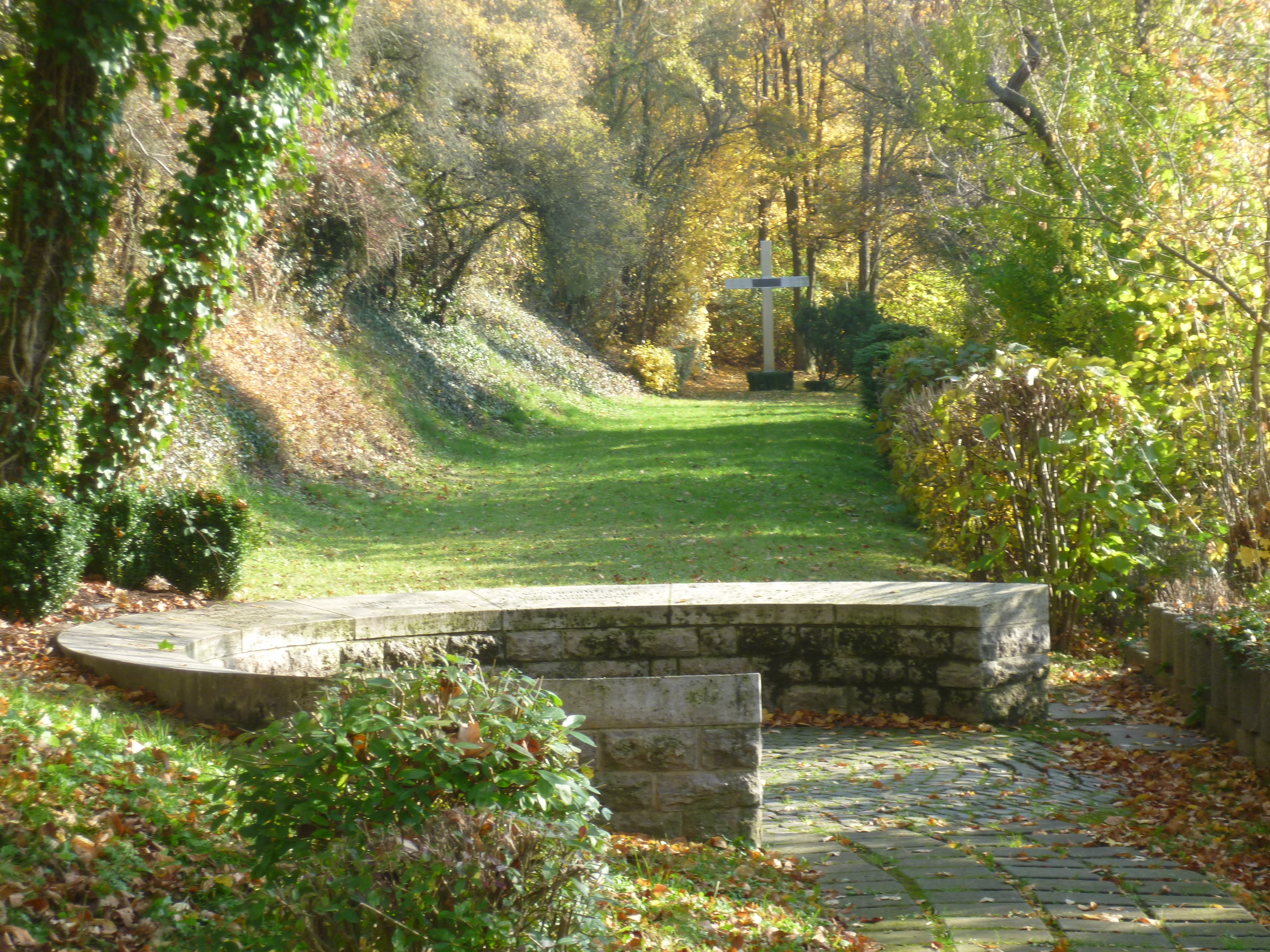
Memorial at Veitenmühlberg

The memorial at Veitenmühlberg (Note: 50°13′1.28″N 8°16′7.92″E) was erected where Nazi-era victims were buried in mass graves. No exhumations or precise delineation of the burial field have occurred. Accessible via Veitenmühlberg road, the memorial is near the former hospital where most murders occurred. The two-part memorial, unrecognizable as a cemetery and absent from Google Maps or other digital mapping systems, features a 1987 low masonry wall forming a three-quarter circle with the inscription: "In memory of the victims of tyranny. More than 600 children and adults from Kalmenhof were murdered between 1941–1945. Many are buried here. The number and location of individual graves are unknown." A 1984 steel memorial cross at the burial field's end reads: "In memory of the victims of crimes at Kalmenhof/Idstein during the National Socialist era."
