= Bassermann =

Bassermann is a surname. Notable people with the surname include:

- Albert Bassermann (1867–1952), German actor
- Elsa Bassermann (1878–1961), German screenwriter, stage and film actress
- Ernst Bassermann (1854–1917), German politician
- Friedrich Daniel Bassermann (1811–1855), German politician
- Hans Bassermann (1888–1978), German violinist and music scholar
- Heinrich Bassermann (1849–1909), German theologian
- Julie Bassermann (1860–1940), German women's rights activist
