= Heinrich Bassermann =

German Lutheran theologian

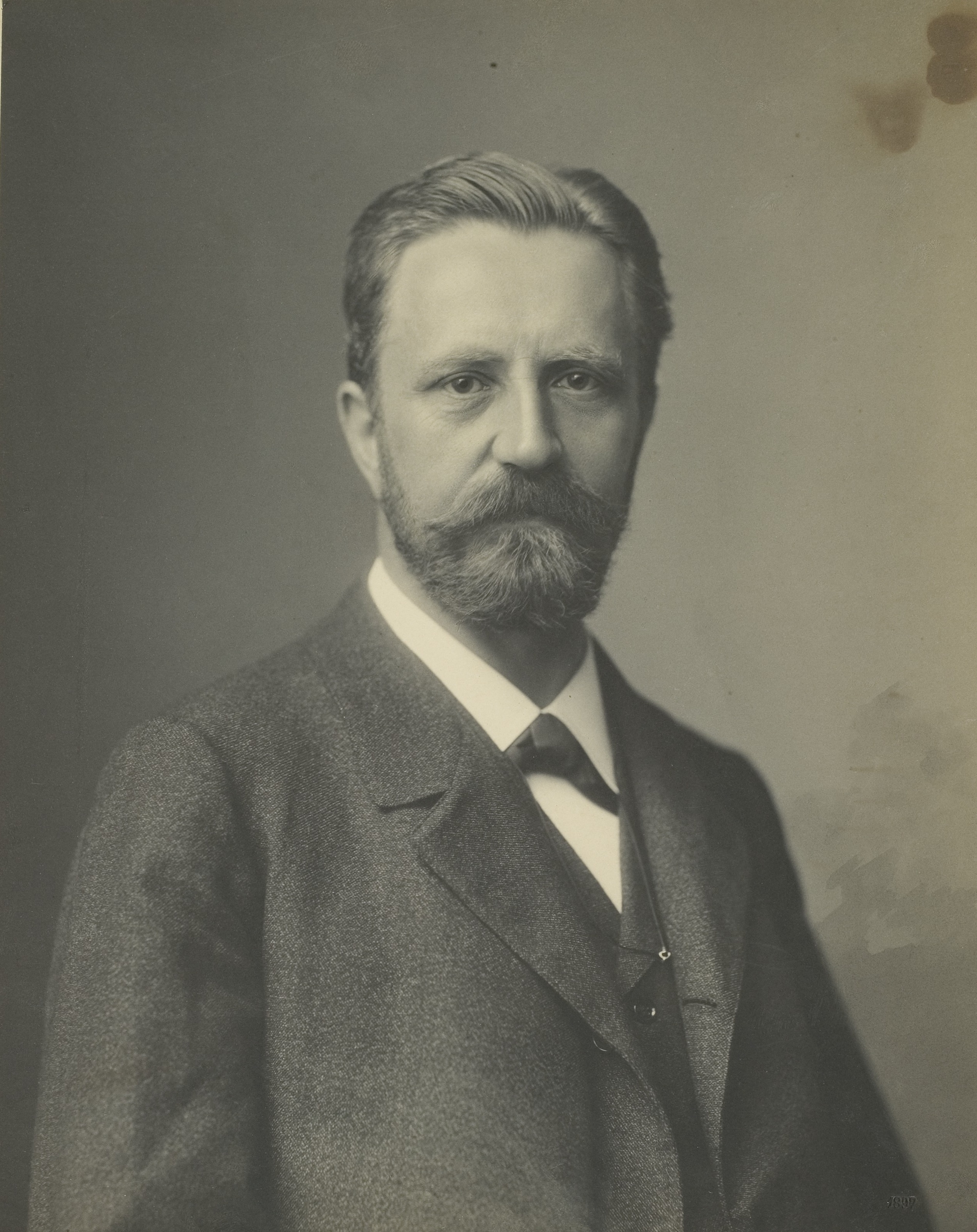
Heinrich Bassermann

Heinrich Gustav Bassermann (12 July 1849 – 30 August 1909) was a German Lutheran theologian born in Frankfurt am Main.

From 1868 to 1873 he was a student at the universities of Jena, Zurich and Heidelberg. At Jena he was a pupil of Karl August Hase (1800–1890), and in Heidelberg he studied under Heinrich Julius Holtzmann (1832–1910). During this time period he also served with a dragoon unit in the Franco-Prussian War (1870–71).

In 1873–76 he was an assistant pastor in Arolsen, and later worked as a lecturer of New Testament exegesis at the University of Jena. Soon afterwards he was appointed an associate professor of practical theology at Heidelberg, where in 1880 he became a full professor and a university preacher.

Bassermann was co-founder of the Allgemeinen evangelisch-protestantischen Missionsvereins, and from 1879 was editor of the "Zeitschrift für praktische Theologie" in collaboration with Rudolf Ehlers (1834–1908). He died in Samaden, Switzerland on 30 August 1909.

== Selected publications ==
- Dreissig christliche Predigten (Thirty Christian sermons), 1875.
- Handbuch der geistlichen Beredsamkeit (Textbook of spiritual eloquence), 1885.
- Akademische Predigten (Academic sermons), 1886.
- System der Liturgik (System of liturgics), 1889.
- Geschichte der badischen Gottesdienstordnung (History of the Baden order of worship), 1891.
- Sine ira et studio, 1894.
- Der badische Katechismus erklärt (The Baden Catechism explained), 1896–97.
- Richard Rothe als praktischer Theologe (Richard Rothe as practical theologian), 1899.
- Zur Frage des Unionskatechismus (On the question of Union Catechism), 1901.
- Ueber Reform des Abendmahls (Regarding reform of the Eucharist), 1904.
- Wie studiert man evangelische Theologie? (How does one study evangelical theology?), 1905.
- Gott: Fünf Predigten (God: five sermons), 1905.
