= Rudolf Ehlers =

Rudolf Ehlers (March 30, 1834 – August 7, 1908) was a German theologian and clergyman born in Hamburg.

He received his education at the Universities of Heidelberg, Berlin and Göttingen. At Heidelberg, he was a student of Richard Rothe (1799-1867). After completion of studies he served as a pastor in Stolberg, and in 1864 relocated to the Protestant Reformed Church at Frankfurt am Main. In 1868 he was appointed Konsistorialrat.

In 1879 he became co-editor of the journal "Zeitschrift fur praktische Theologie", and in 1884 was co-founder and vice-president of the Allgemeinen evangelisch-protestantischen Missionsvereins, today known as Deutschen Ostasienmission (German East Asia Mission). In 1889 he was awarded with an honorary doctorate from the University of Jena.

== Selected publications ==
- Evangelische Predigten (Evangelical sermons), 1873.
- Das alte Gesetz und die neue Zeit (The old law and the new life), 1877.
- Bilder aus dem Leben des Apostels Paulus (Pictures from the life of the Apostle Paul), 1886.
- Richard Rothe, 1906.
