= Moneilema ebeninum =

Scientific classification
- Domain: Eukaryota
- Kingdom: Animalia
- Phylum: Arthropoda
- Class: Insecta
- Order: Coleoptera
- Suborder: Polyphaga
- Infraorder: Cucujiformia
- Family: Cerambycidae
- Genus: Moneilema
- Species: M. ebeninum

Binomial name
- Moneilema ebeninum Bates, 1885

Species of beetle

Moneilema ebeninum is a species of beetle in the family Cerambycidae. It was described by Henry Walter Bates in 1885.
