= Moneilema appressum =

Scientific classification
- Domain: Eukaryota
- Kingdom: Animalia
- Phylum: Arthropoda
- Class: Insecta
- Order: Coleoptera
- Suborder: Polyphaga
- Infraorder: Cucujiformia
- Family: Cerambycidae
- Genus: Moneilema
- Species: M. appressum

Binomial name
- Moneilema appressum LeConte, 1852

Species of beetle

Moneilema appressum is a species of beetle in the family Cerambycidae. It was described by John Lawrence LeConte in 1852.
