= Moneilema michelbacheri =

Scientific classification
- Domain: Eukaryota
- Kingdom: Animalia
- Phylum: Arthropoda
- Class: Insecta
- Order: Coleoptera
- Suborder: Polyphaga
- Infraorder: Cucujiformia
- Family: Cerambycidae
- Genus: Moneilema
- Species: M. michelbacheri

Binomial name
- Moneilema michelbacheri Linsley, 1942

Species of beetle

Moneilema michelbacheri is a species of beetle in the family Cerambycidae. It was described by Linsley in 1942.
