= Moneilema opuntiae =

Scientific classification
- Domain: Eukaryota
- Kingdom: Animalia
- Phylum: Arthropoda
- Class: Insecta
- Order: Coleoptera
- Suborder: Polyphaga
- Infraorder: Cucujiformia
- Family: Cerambycidae
- Genus: Moneilema
- Species: M. opuntiae

Binomial name
- Moneilema opuntiae Fisher, 1928

Species of beetle

Moneilema opuntiae is a species of beetle in the family Cerambycidae. It was described by Fisher in 1928.
