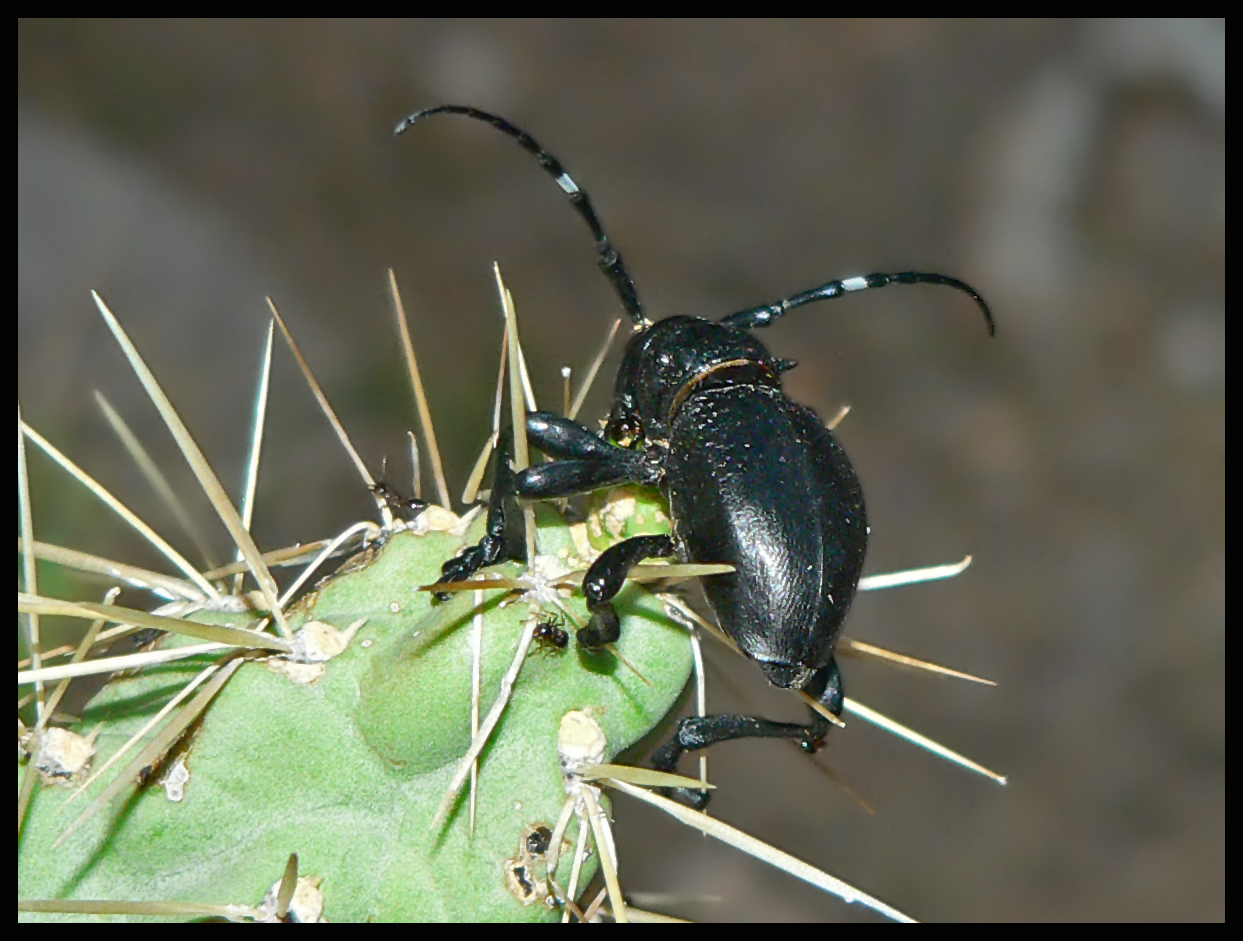
- Moneilema gigas at the Arizona-Sonora Desert Museum

Scientific classification
- Kingdom: Animalia
- Phylum: Arthropoda
- Class: Insecta
- Order: Coleoptera
- Suborder: Polyphaga
- Infraorder: Cucujiformia
- Family: Cerambycidae
- Subfamily: Lamiinae
- Tribe: Acanthocinini
- Genus: Moneilema; Say, 1824

= Moneilema =

Cactus longhorn beetle

Genus of beetles

Moneilema, or cactus longhorn beetles are a genus of large, flightless, black beetles found in North American deserts of the western United States and northern Mexico. M. gigas is native to the Sonoran Desert at elevations below 4900 feet (1500 m). The front wings of these beetles are fused forming a single, hardened shell, from which the genus derives its Latin name. The genus includes twenty species.

Longhorn cactus beetles feed on chollas and prickly pear cacti and are known to feed on saguaro seedlings. Larvae bore into cactus roots and stems, sometimes killing more susceptible individuals. Adults also feed on the surface of cacti.

Most Moneilema species are active during mid or late summer - the adults typically emerging during the summer monsoon season. Some Moneilema species in central and southern Mexico are reported to be active all year.

Like many flightless beetles, these beetles have limited wing musculature with a rounded abdomen and thorax, similar in appearance to a number of other flightless desert beetles. Cactus longhorn beetles resemble and mimic the behavior of noxious stink beetles in the genus Eleodes.

== Species ==
- Moneilema albopictum White, 1856
- Moneilema annulatum Say, 1824
- Moneilema appressum LeConte, 1852
- Moneilema armatum LeConte, 1853
- Moneilema aterrimum Fisher, 1931
- Moneilema blapsides Newman, 1838
- Moneilema crassipes Fisher, 1931
- Moneilema ebeninum Bates, 1885
- Moneilema gigas LeConte, 1873
- Moneilema longipes White, 1856
- Moneilema manni Psota, 1930
- Moneilema mexicanum Fisher, 1926
- Moneilema michelbacheri Linsley, 1942
- Moneilema opuntiae Fisher, 1928
- Moneilema punctipenne Fisher, 1926
- Moneilema rugosissimum Casey, 1924
- Moneilema semipunctatum LeConte, 1852
- Moneilema subrugosum Bland, 1862
- Moneilema variolare Thomson, 1867
- Moneilema wickhami Psota, 1930
