= Moneilema subrugosum =

Scientific classification
- Domain: Eukaryota
- Kingdom: Animalia
- Phylum: Arthropoda
- Class: Insecta
- Order: Coleoptera
- Suborder: Polyphaga
- Infraorder: Cucujiformia
- Family: Cerambycidae
- Genus: Moneilema
- Species: M. subrugosum

Binomial name
- Moneilema subrugosum Bland, 1862

Species of beetle

Moneilema subrugosum is a species of beetle in the family Cerambycidae. It was described by Bland in 1862.
