= Moneilema longipes =

Scientific classification
- Domain: Eukaryota
- Kingdom: Animalia
- Phylum: Arthropoda
- Class: Insecta
- Order: Coleoptera
- Suborder: Polyphaga
- Infraorder: Cucujiformia
- Family: Cerambycidae
- Genus: Moneilema
- Species: M. longipes

Binomial name
- Moneilema longipes White, 1856

Species of beetle

Moneilema longipes is a species of beetle in the family Cerambycidae. It was described by White in 1856.
