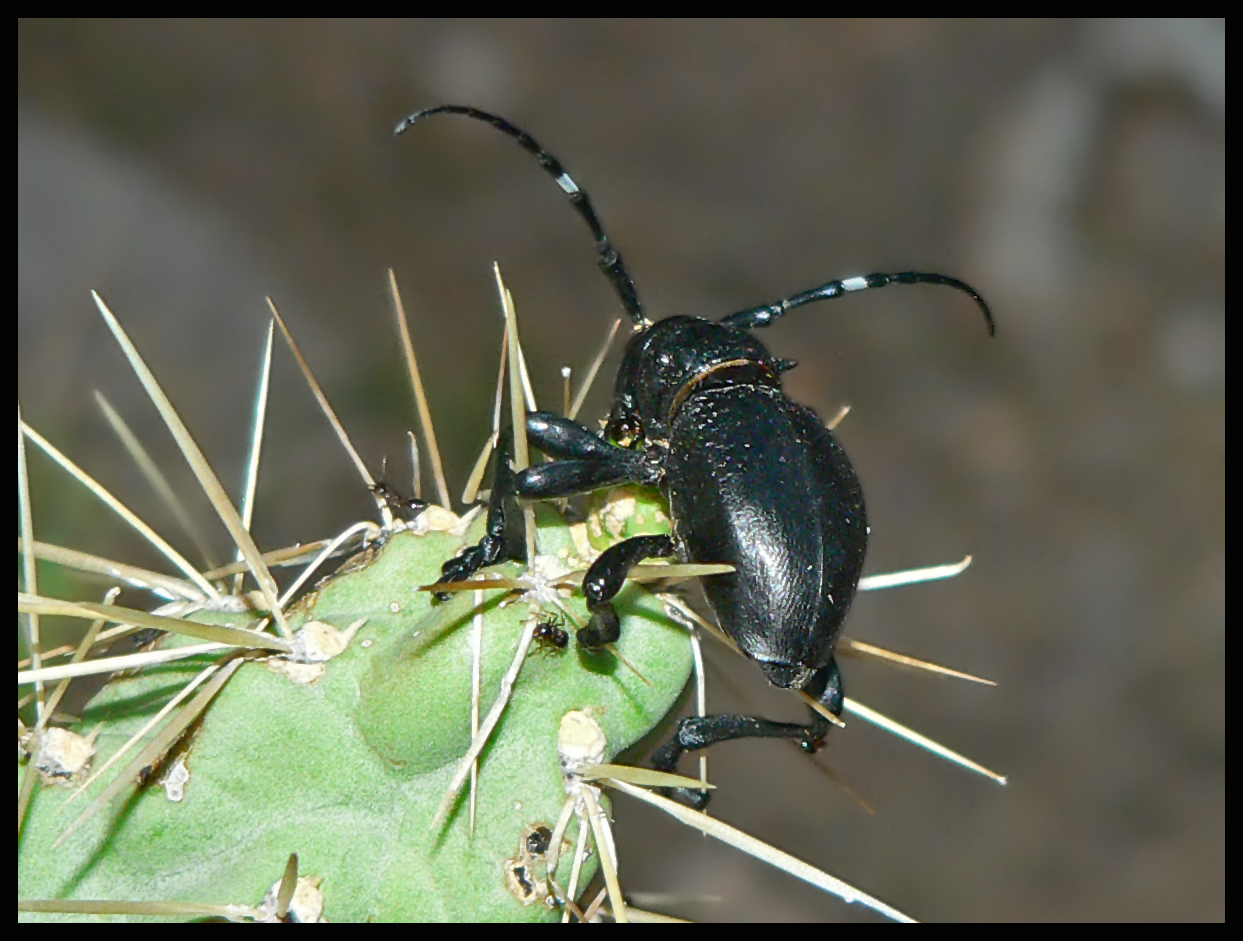
- Moneilema gigas at the Arizona-Sonora Desert Museum

Scientific classification
- Kingdom: Animalia
- Phylum: Arthropoda
- Class: Insecta
- Order: Coleoptera
- Suborder: Polyphaga
- Infraorder: Cucujiformia
- Family: Cerambycidae
- Genus: Moneilema
- Species: M. gigas

Binomial name
- Moneilema gigas LeConte 1873

= Moneilema gigas =

Species of beetle

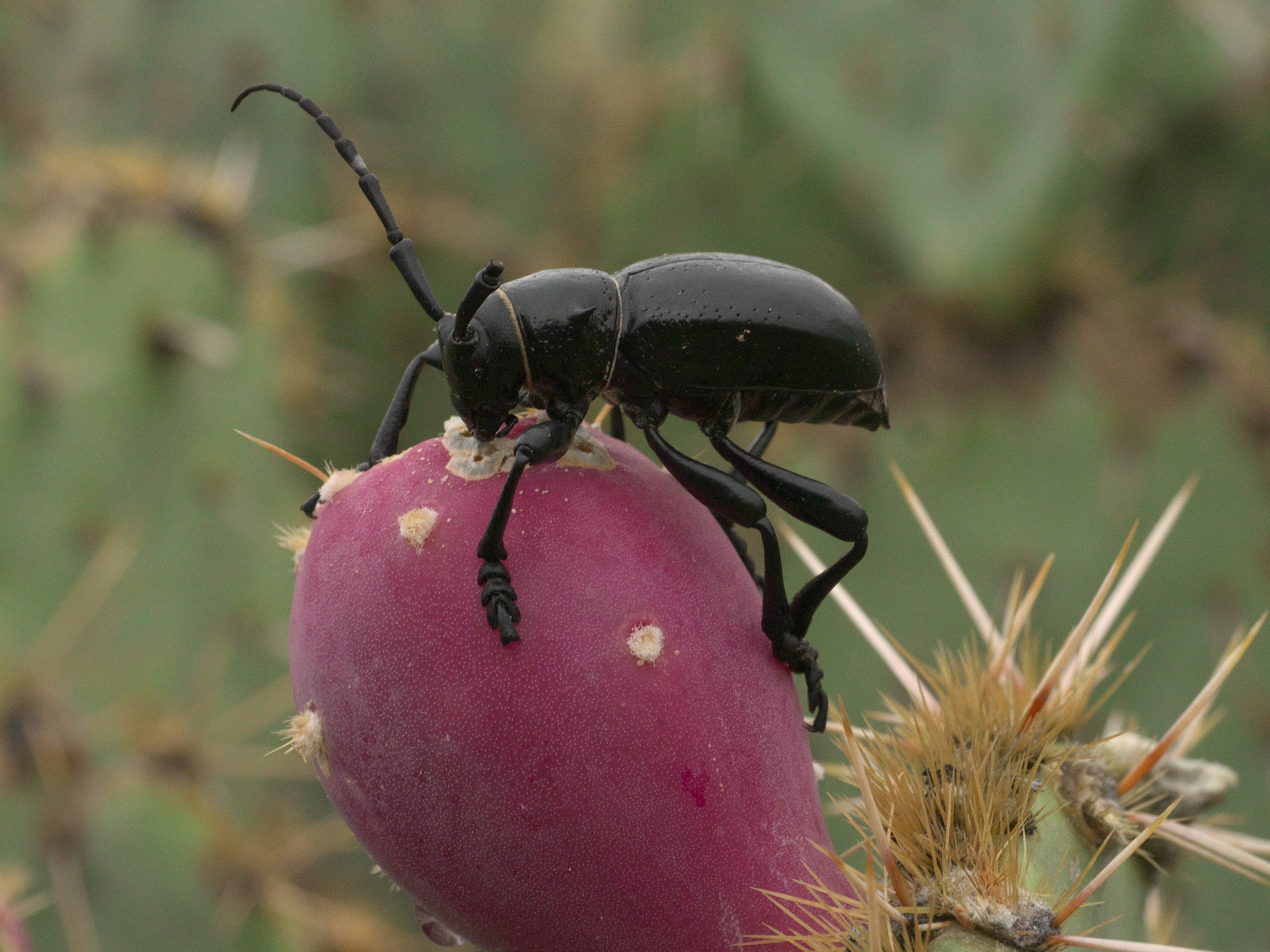
Moneilema gigas, Pima County, Arizona

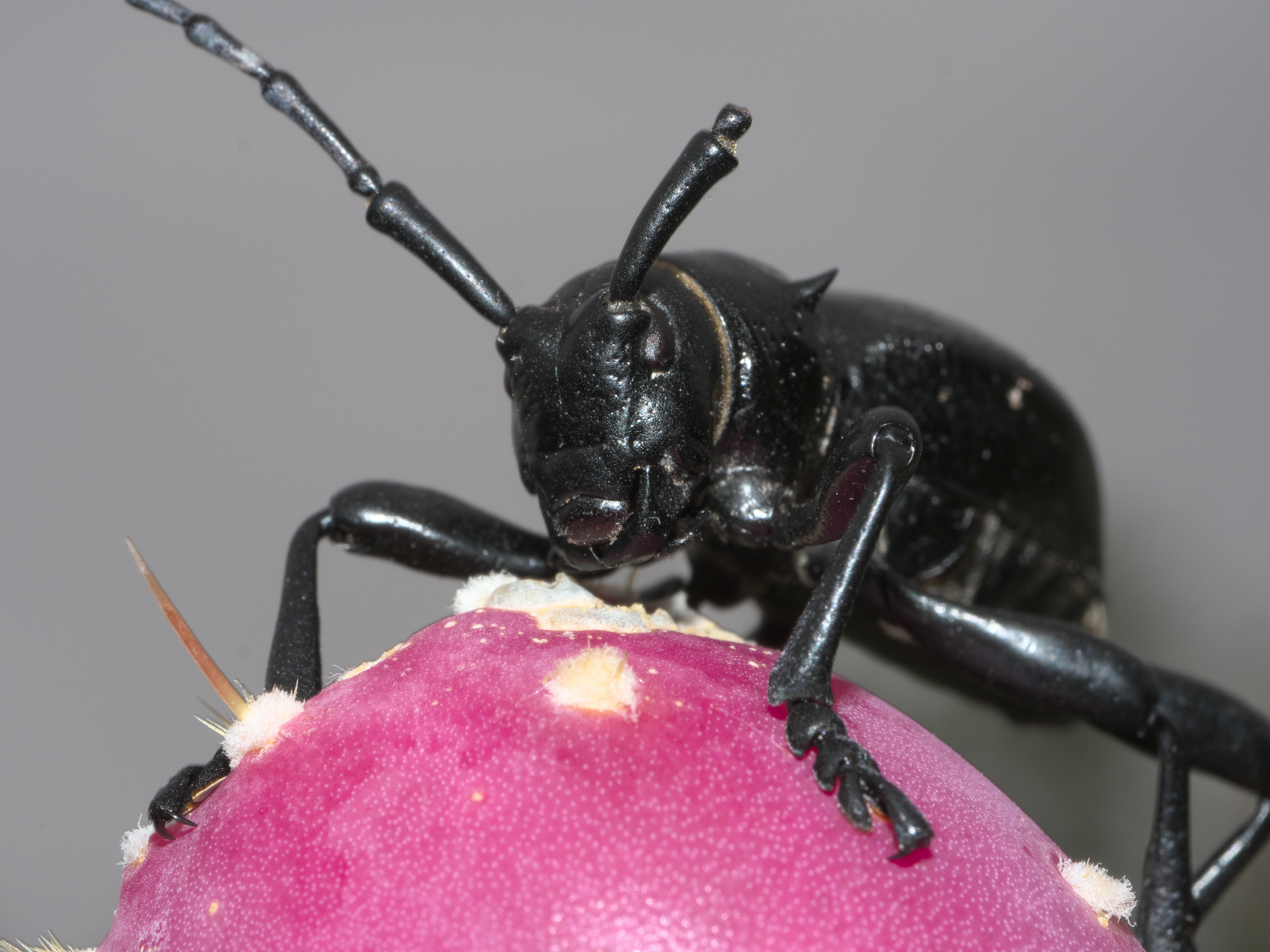
Moneilema gigas, Pima County, Arizona

Moneilema gigas is a large, flightless, black beetle native to the Sonoran desert at elevations below 1500 metres. The front wings are fused forming a single, hardened shell. Collectively—with 19 other Moneilema species—M. gigas is also known as the cactus longhorn beetle.

Moneilema gigas normally feeds on chollas and prickly pear cacti, and is known to feed on saguaro seedlings. Larvae bore into cactus roots and stems, sometimes killing more susceptible individuals. Adults also feed on the surface of cacti. M. gigas are most active during mid or late summer—the adults typically emerging during the summer monsoon season.

Like many flightless beetles, these beetles have limited wing musculature with a rounded abdomen and thorax, similar in appearance to a number of other flightless desert beetles. Cactus longhorn beetles resemble and mimic the behavior of noxious stink beetles in the genus Eleodes.
