= Moneilema rugosissimum =

Scientific classification
- Kingdom: Animalia
- Phylum: Arthropoda
- Class: Insecta
- Order: Coleoptera
- Suborder: Polyphaga
- Infraorder: Cucujiformia
- Family: Cerambycidae
- Genus: Moneilema
- Species: M. rugosissimum

Binomial name
- Moneilema rugosissimum Casey, 1924

Species of beetle

Moneilema rugosissimum is a species of beetle in the family Cerambycidae. It was described by Casey in 1924.
