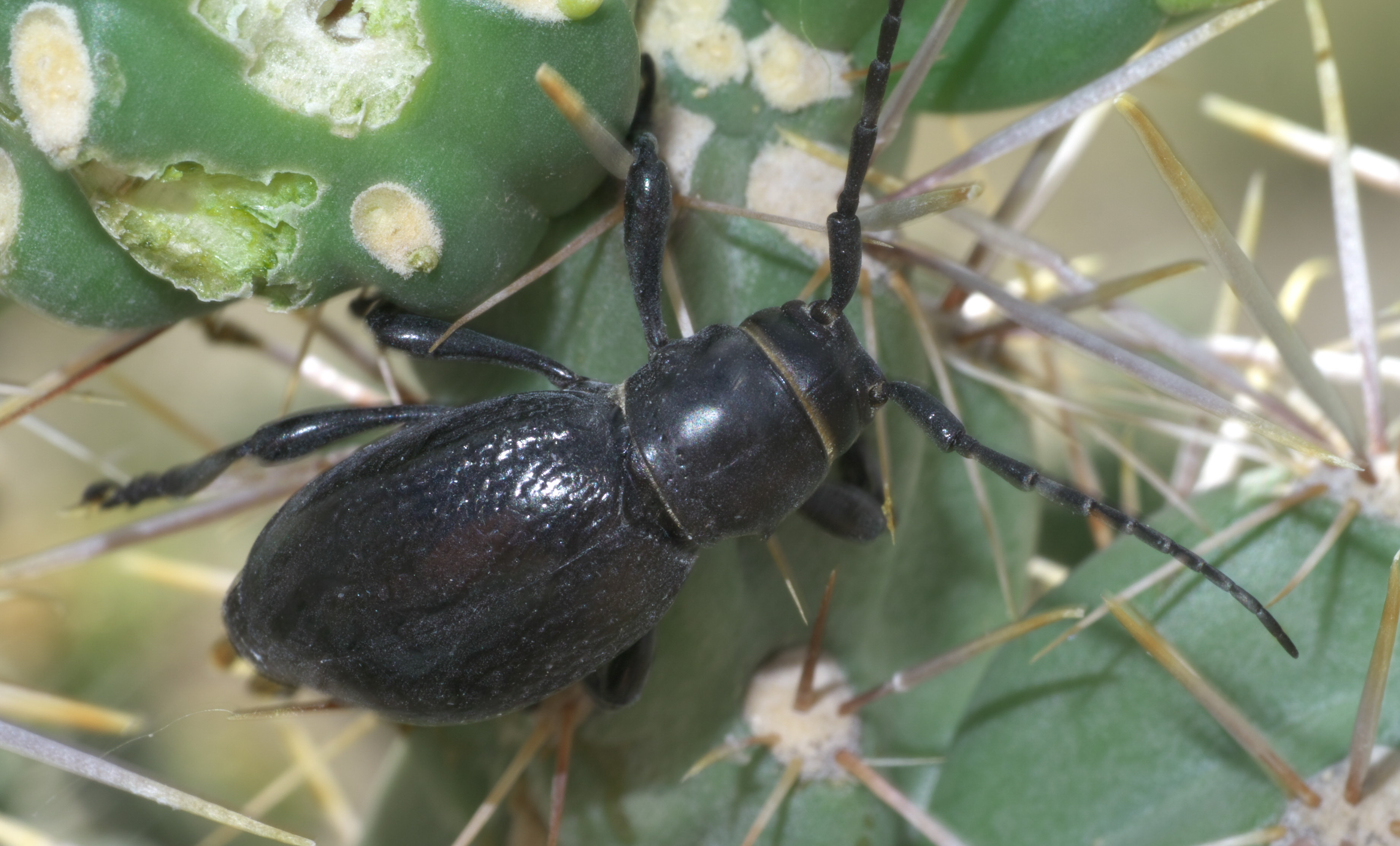
- Moneilema armatum, Cimarron County, Oklahoma

Scientific classification
- Domain: Eukaryota
- Kingdom: Animalia
- Phylum: Arthropoda
- Class: Insecta
- Order: Coleoptera
- Suborder: Polyphaga
- Infraorder: Cucujiformia
- Family: Cerambycidae
- Genus: Moneilema
- Species: M. armatum

Binomial name
- Moneilema armatum LeConte, 1853

Synonyms
- Moneilema convexa Casey, 1924; Moneilema crassum LeConte, 1853; Moneilema femoralis Casey, 1913; Moneilema isolatum Psota, 1930; Moneilema laevigatum Bland, 1862; Moneilema obesa Casey, 1924; Moneilema punctatum Psota, 1930; Moneilema rector Casey, 1913; Moneilema rugosipennis Fisher, 1928; Moneilema simplicicornis Casey, 1913; Moneilema simplicicornis grylliceps Casey, 1913; Moneilema solida Psota, 1930; Moneilema walsenburgi Casey, 1913

= Moneilema armatum =

Species of beetle

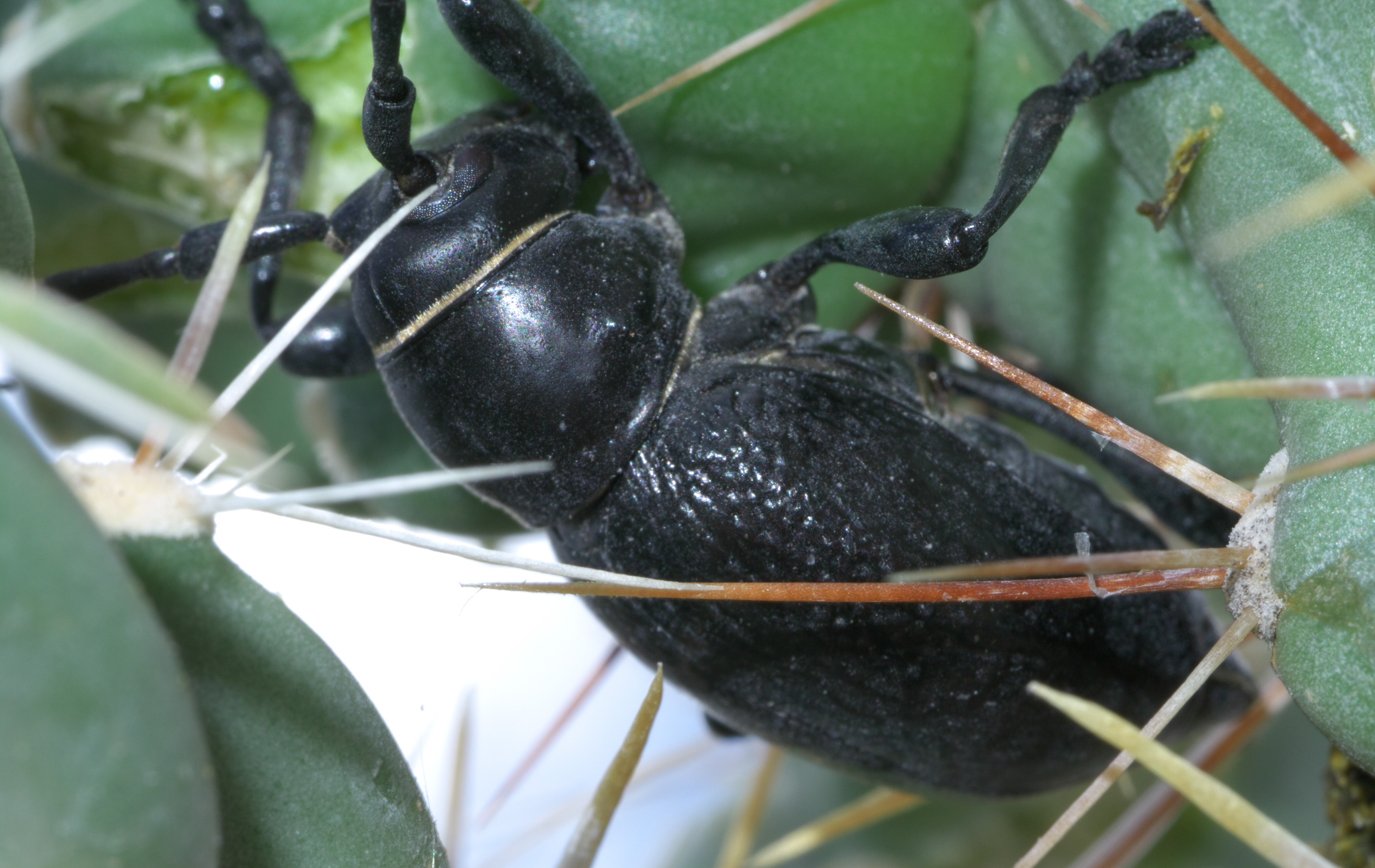

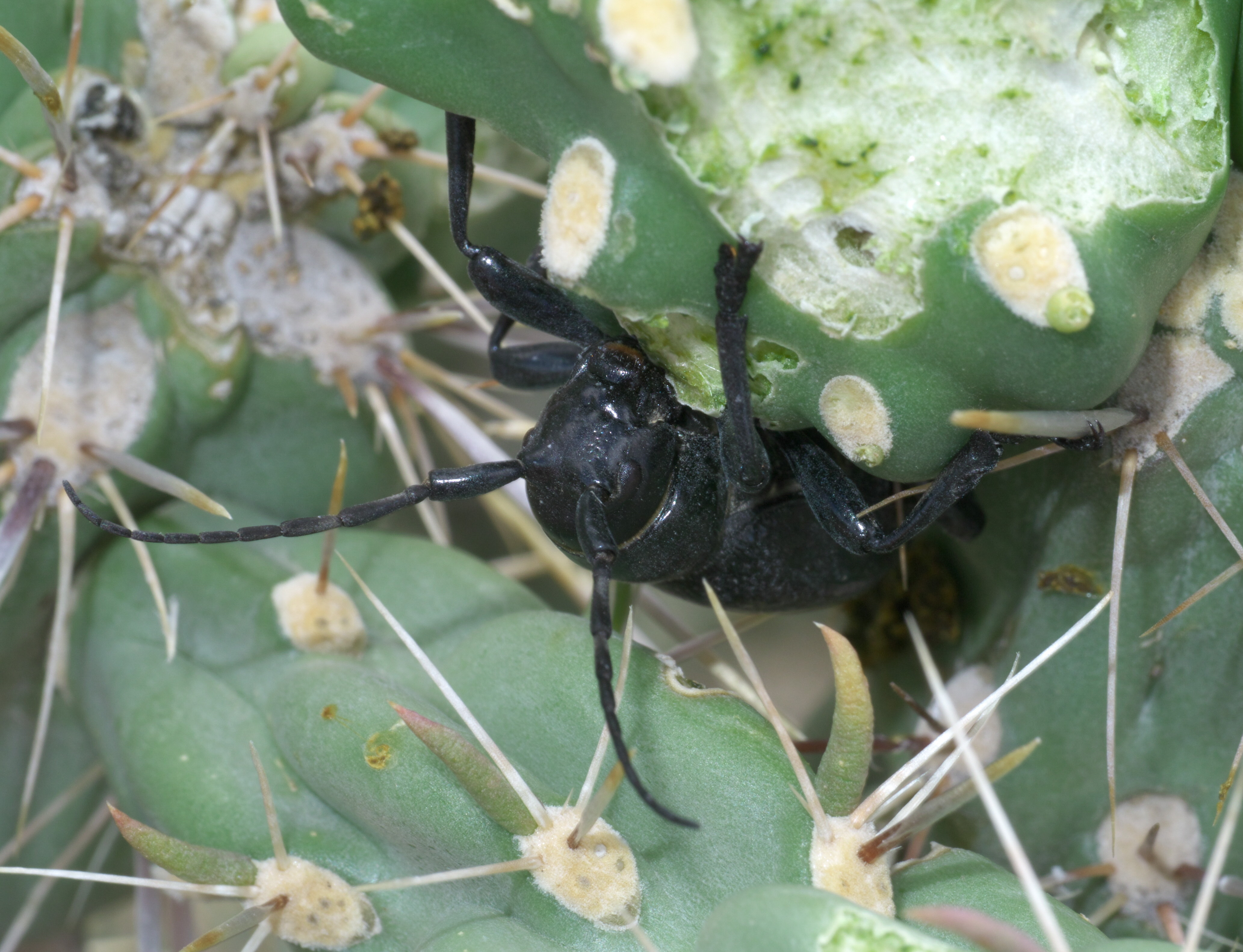

Moneilema armatum is a species of flat-faced longhorn in the family of beetles known as Cerambycidae. It is found in the southwestern United States and northern Mexico. The flightless beetles often feed on prickly pear cactus, boring into the stems and roots.
