= Moneilema punctipenne =

Scientific classification
- Domain: Eukaryota
- Kingdom: Animalia
- Phylum: Arthropoda
- Class: Insecta
- Order: Coleoptera
- Suborder: Polyphaga
- Infraorder: Cucujiformia
- Family: Cerambycidae
- Genus: Moneilema
- Species: M. punctipenne

Binomial name
- Moneilema punctipenne Fisher, 1926

Species of beetle

Moneilema punctipenne is a species of beetle in the family Cerambycidae. It was described by Fisher in 1926.
