= Moneilema variolare =

Scientific classification
- Domain: Eukaryota
- Kingdom: Animalia
- Phylum: Arthropoda
- Class: Insecta
- Order: Coleoptera
- Suborder: Polyphaga
- Infraorder: Cucujiformia
- Family: Cerambycidae
- Genus: Moneilema
- Species: M. variolare

Binomial name
- Moneilema variolare Thomson, 1867

Species of beetle

Moneilema variolare is a species of beetle in the family Cerambycidae. It was described by Thomson in 1867. It has been identified as a pest on Lophocereus marginatus. Adults feed on L. marginatus, and females then lay eggs inside the plant.
