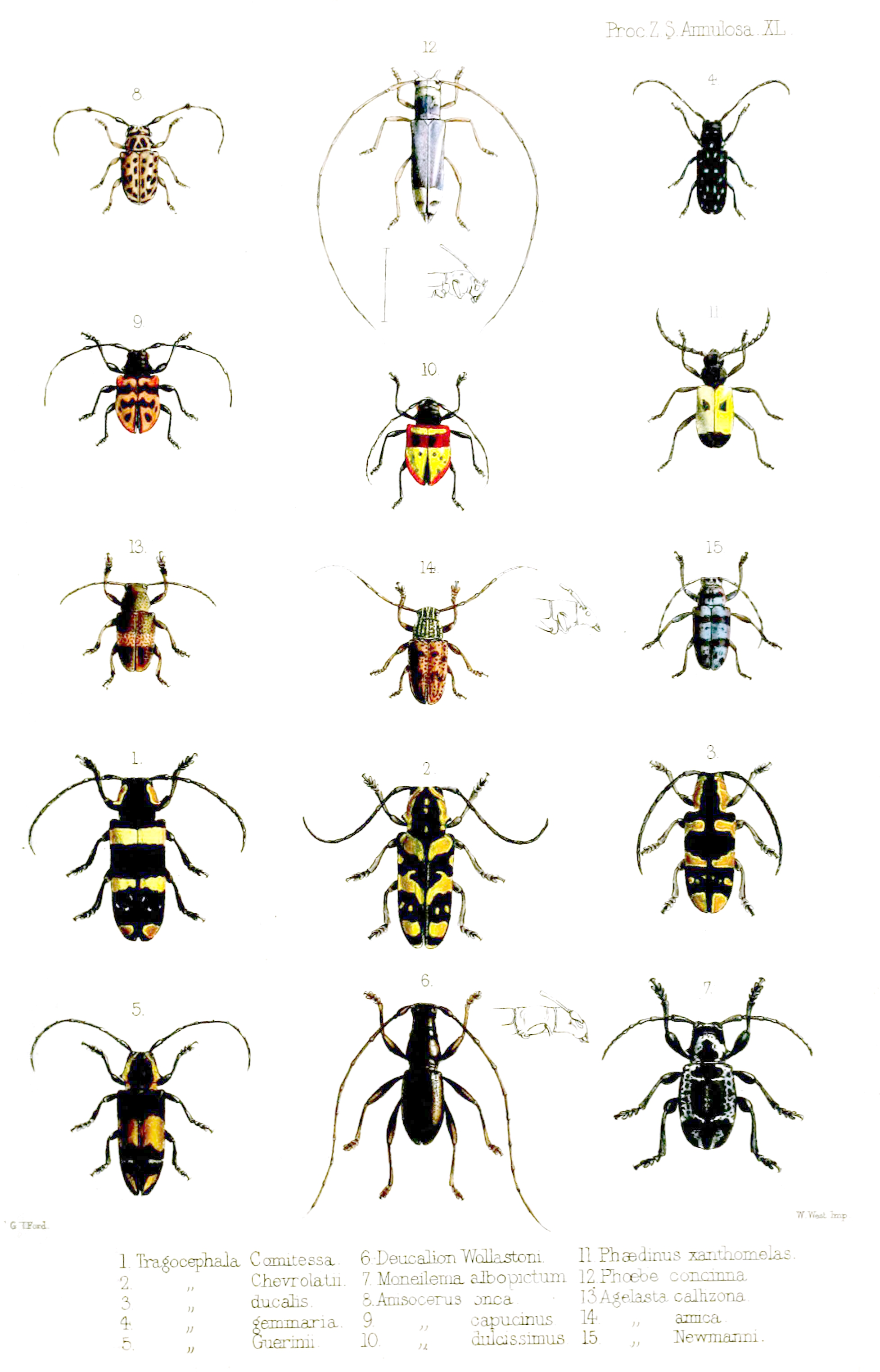

Scientific classification
- Domain: Eukaryota
- Kingdom: Animalia
- Phylum: Arthropoda
- Class: Insecta
- Order: Coleoptera
- Suborder: Polyphaga
- Infraorder: Cucujiformia
- Family: Cerambycidae
- Genus: Moneilema
- Species: M. albopictum

Binomial name
- Moneilema albopictum White, 1856

= Moneilema albopictum =

Species of beetle

Moneilema albopictum is a species of beetle in the family Cerambycidae. It was described by White in 1856.
