= Melocactus peruvianus =

Conservation status
- Least Concern (IUCN 3.1)

Scientific classification
- Kingdom: Plantae
- Clade: Tracheophytes
- Clade: Angiosperms
- Clade: Eudicots
- Order: Caryophyllales
- Family: Cactaceae
- Subfamily: Cactoideae
- Genus: Melocactus
- Species: M. peruvianus

Binomial name
- Melocactus peruvianus Vaupel

Synonyms
- This species has 13 synonyms: (see text)

Species of cactus

Melocactus peruvianus is a species of succulent flowering plant in the genus Melocactus, within the family Cactaceae. It is native to southwestern Ecuador and Peru. It is characterized by its cephalium, an apical reproductive structure covered with wool and spines from which flowers and fruits are borne.

== Description ==
Melocactus peruvianus is a species of cactus with a solitary habit. The stem is mucilaginous, and varies in form from globose-flattened to pyramidal or short-cylindrical. It measures at least 20 cm tall and wide, and its epidermis is dark green in color.

The stem has 8-16 ribs which are up to 2 cm tall and more or less acute. The areoles, which are at least 8 mm long and spaced 1-2 cm apart, are situated on the ribs. Each areole possesses 6-18 red-brown to black spines whose form and arrangement are extremely variable. This species' areoles have 1-4 central spines (which are sometimes absent) that measure up to 6 cm long and 1.8 mm thick. 4-14 radial spines are also present; these also grow to 6 cm long and 1.8 mm thick, are straight to strongly curved, and sometimes appear intertwined or arranged in a pectinate manner.

After completing vegetative growth during the juvenile stage, adult specimens develop cephalia on their apices. This woolly structure is made up of numerous densely-packed areoles covered in white woolly trichomes and conspicuous reddish bristles. It can grow up to 20 cm tall and 8 cm wide, although it is often smaller than this. With age, the cephalium stops growing in circumference, but continues slowly growing vertically and remains on the plant for many years.

Plant in flower

The flowers develop from the areoles that make up the cephalium. They are magenta in color, measure approximately 2.3 cm long and 0.8-1.5 cm wide, and clearly stand out from the cephalium. From above, 16 segments of the perianth may be observed, each of which measures up to 1 cm long and 1.5 mm wide; the innermost segments surround the style. The stigma has 4-6 white lobes, which stand out from the flower.

The fruits are red and measure 1.6-2.5 cm long and 5.5-8 mm in diameter. The seeds measure 0.95-1.1 mm long and 0.7-0.95 mm wide with barely-elevated seed coat cells with conspicuous cuticular folds.

== Distribution and habitat ==
Melocactus peruvianus is native to the western slope of the Andes, from the province of El Oro in southwestern Ecuador to the departments of Tumbes, Piura, Lambayeque, La Libertad, Áncash, Lima, and Arequipa in western Peru.

It mainly inhabits desert and dry scrubland habitats from sea level to 1270 meters in elevation. It grows on rocky and sandy substrates, occasionally near mangrove forests.

== Taxonomy ==
Melocactus peruvianus was described by the German botanist Friedrich Karl Johann Vaupel, who published this name in the scientific journal Botanische Jahrbücher für Systematik, Pflanzengeschichte und Pflanzengeographie 111: 28 in 1913.

Etymology

- Melocactus: the genus name is derived from the Greek words mēlon (meaning "apple" or "tree fruit") and kaktos (meaning "thistle" or "spiny plant"). This name references the size and shape of the plant, and how they resemble those of a fruit.
- peruvianus: the specific epithet refers to the fact that this species is found in Peru.

Synonyms

- Cactus jansenianus (Backeb.) Borg, 1937
- Cactus townsendii Britton & Rose, 1922
- Melocactus amstutziae Rauh & Backeb., 1956 publ. 1957
- Melocactus fortalezensis Rauh & Backeb., 1956 publ. 1957
- Melocactus huallancensis Rauh & Backeb., 1958
- Melocactus jansenianus Backeb., 1933
- Melocactus peruvianus var. amstutziae Rauh & Backeb., 1958
- Melocactus peruvianus var. canetensis Rauh & Backeb., 1958

== Conservation status ==
On the IUCN Red List, Melocactus peruvianus is classified as "Least Concern" (LC) because of its wide geographical distribution, its local abundance, its presence in protected areas, and the absence of significant threats.

== Cultivation ==
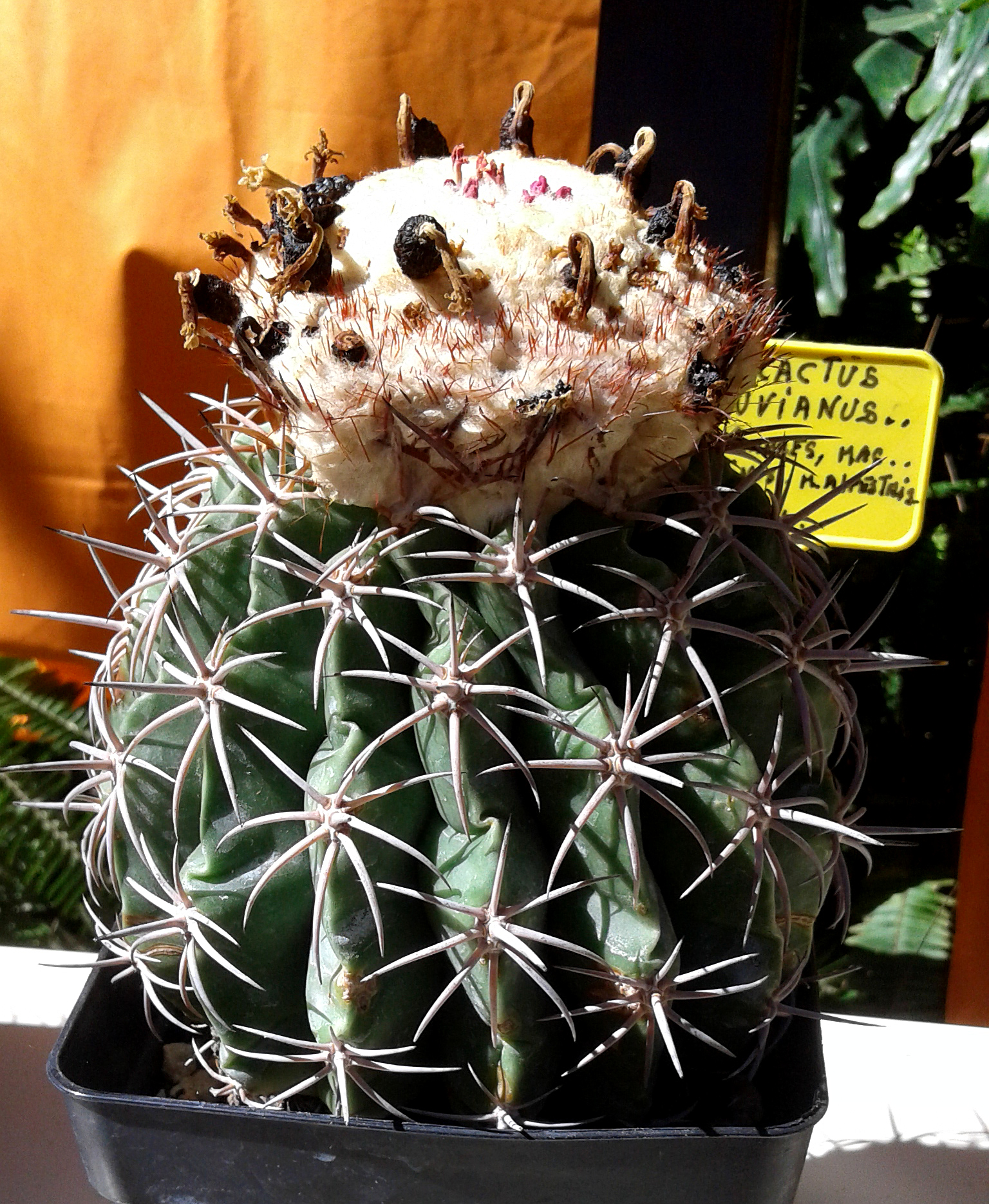
In cultivation

Melocactus peruvianus is cultivated primarily as an ornamental. Its cultivation requires some experience, and is not recommended for beginner cactus growers. Its root system is weak, making it difficult for the plant to absorb water from moist soils; this makes the plant susceptible to both long periods of drought and excessive moisture, the latter of which can cause root rot.

Due to its tropical origin, this species requires a relatively high level of watering, although the substrate should be allowed to dry out completely between irrigation. It does not tolerate cold or cool temperatures, so it is necessary to keep it at a temperature above 8-12 °C (46.4-53.6 °F). Low temperatures can severely damage or kill the plant, even in conditions that other cacti can tolerate without problems.

In winter, Melocactus peruvianus requires more frequent irrigations than other species of cactus, approximately once per month; however, it should not be fertilized during this time. Its weak root system also causes it to have a low tolerance to being transplanted; after such an event, the plant needs a long period of time to recover. The substrate should be very well-draining, and the plant requires high light levels, although less than cacti native to more arid environments.

This species may only be propagated by seed. Seeds should be sown on a light, sandy, and porous substrate. While the seeds germinate, sufficient humidity must be maintained so that the seeds do not dry out; they may be kept, for example, under glass, or in a closed plastic bag or takeout container. Optimum germination rates are achieved at temperatures between 18 and 22 °C (64.4-71.6 °F).

== Gallery ==
Immature plants without cephalia

Mature plant with cephalium

Plant with flower buds

Flowers

Fruits
