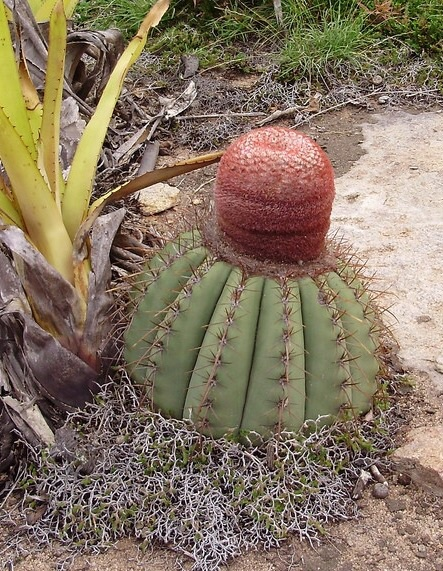

Conservation status
- Least Concern (IUCN 3.1)

Scientific classification
- Kingdom: Plantae
- Clade: Tracheophytes
- Clade: Angiosperms
- Clade: Eudicots
- Order: Caryophyllales
- Family: Cactaceae
- Subfamily: Cactoideae
- Genus: Melocactus
- Species: M. ernestii

Binomial name
- Melocactus ernestii Vaupel

= Melocactus ernestii =

Species of cactus

Melocactus ernesti is one of the Turk's cap cacti, and is native to Bahia and Minas Gerais States, Brazil.

== Description ==
Melocactus ernestii grows with light yellowish green to dark green, almost spherical to short cylindrical bodies that reach heights of 9 to 45 centimeters and a diameter of 7 to 35 centimeters. There are 9 to 13 more or less rounded ribs or ridges with a slightly sharp edge, each with a row of spines usually about 1 to 2 inches (2.5 to 5.1 centimeters) long. The spines are banded red and yellow or reddish or brownish in color. The 3 to 8 central spines, the lowest of which are curved or straight, the spines can occasionally be as much as ten inches (25 centimeters) in length, exceeded only by Ferocactus emoryi subspecies rectispinus. The 7 to 13 straight or outwardly curved radial spines reach lengths of 4 to 15 centimeters. The cephalium is the red, columnar, formed from more or less pink-red bristles, which is rarely covered with white wool at the top, is up to 18 centimeters high and reaches a diameter of up to 8 centimeters composed of hundreds of small, tightly packed flowers and grows a little longer each year.

The light to dark magenta pink flowers are 1.95 to 2.9 inches long and have a diameter of 9 to 18 millimeters. The fruits, which are deep pink to red at the top, are 1.4 to 4.5 centimeters long.

== Distribution ==
Melocactus ernestii is distributed in northeastern Brazil.

The following subspecies are recognized:

- Melocactus ernestii subsp. ernestii
- Melocactus ernestii subsp. longicarpus (Buining & Brederoo) N.P.Taylor

== Taxonomy ==
The first description was in 1920 by Friedrich Karl Johann Vaupel.
