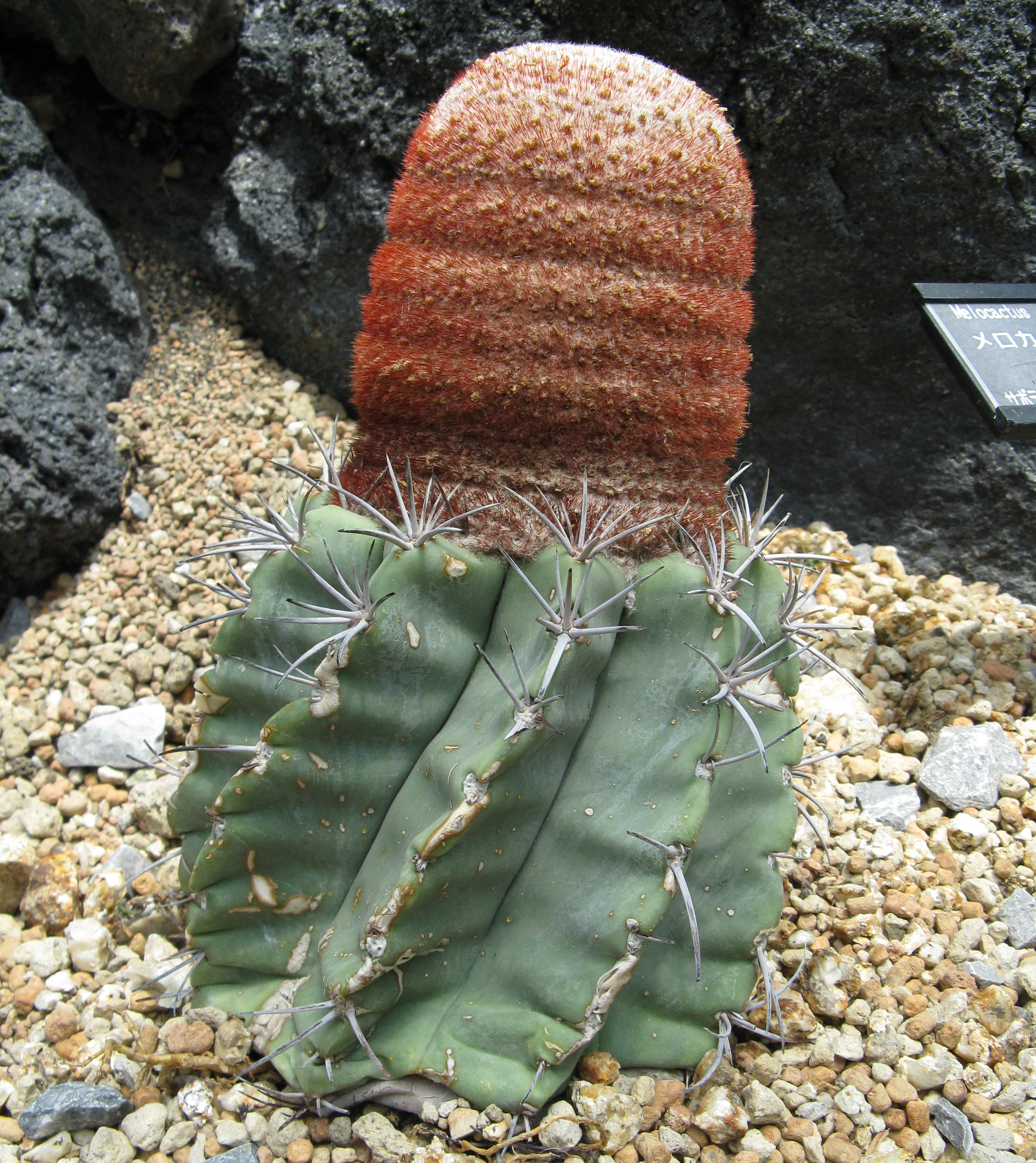

Conservation status
- Endangered (IUCN 3.1)
- CITES Appendix I

Scientific classification
- Kingdom: Plantae
- Clade: Tracheophytes
- Clade: Angiosperms
- Clade: Eudicots
- Order: Caryophyllales
- Family: Cactaceae
- Subfamily: Cactoideae
- Genus: Melocactus
- Species: M. glaucescens

Binomial name
- Melocactus glaucescens Buining & Brederoo

= Melocactus glaucescens =

Species of cactus

Melocactus glaucescens is a species of plant in the family Cactaceae. It is endemic to Brazil. Its natural habitats are rocky areas and hot deserts. It is threatened by habitat loss.

Melocactus glaucescens is identified by its glaucous appearance and its often whitish-yellow cephalium. The color of its cephalium varies slightly based on population.
