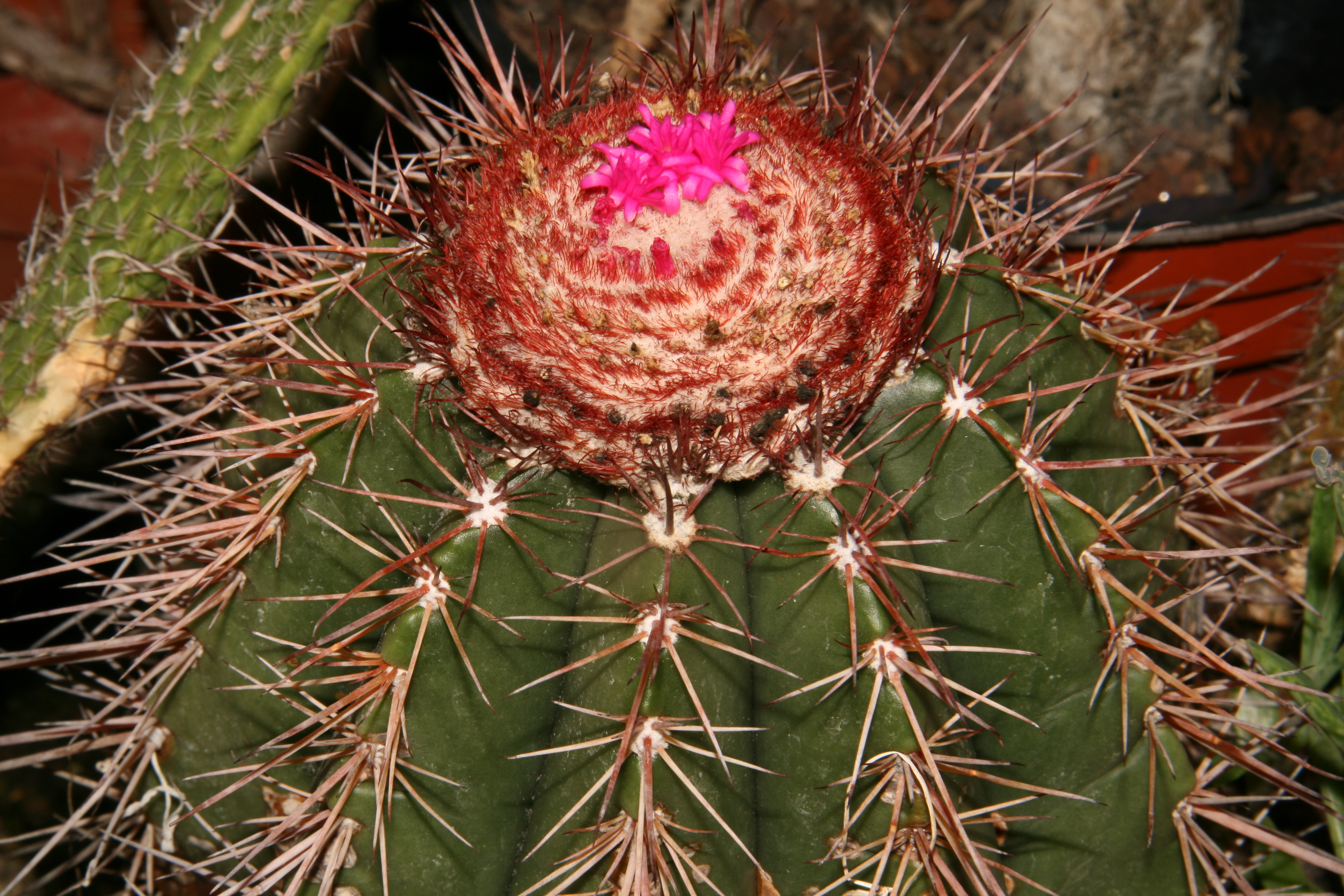

Conservation status
- Least Concern (IUCN 3.1)

Scientific classification
- Kingdom: Plantae
- Clade: Tracheophytes
- Clade: Angiosperms
- Clade: Eudicots
- Order: Caryophyllales
- Family: Cactaceae
- Subfamily: Cactoideae
- Genus: Melocactus
- Species: M. oreas

Binomial name
- Melocactus oreas Miq.

Synonyms
- Cactus oreas (Miq.) Britton & Rose 1922

= Melocactus oreas =

Species of cactus

Melocactus oreas is a species of Melocactus found in Brazil.
