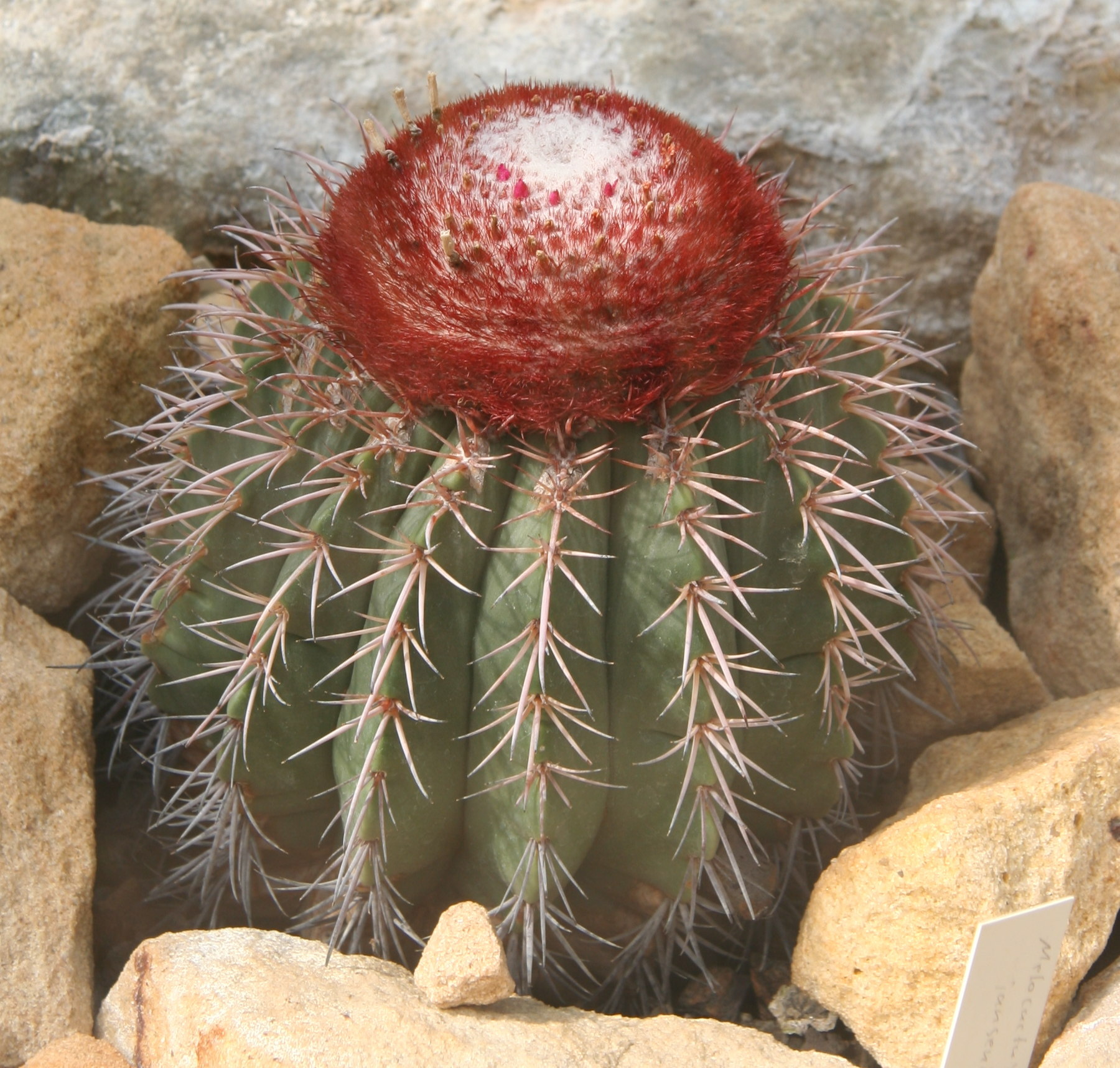

Conservation status
- Endangered (IUCN 3.1)

Scientific classification
- Kingdom: Plantae
- Clade: Tracheophytes
- Clade: Angiosperms
- Clade: Eudicots
- Order: Caryophyllales
- Family: Cactaceae
- Subfamily: Cactoideae
- Genus: Melocactus
- Species: M. lanssensianus

Binomial name
- Melocactus lanssensianus P.J.Braun

= Melocactus lanssensianus =

Species of cactus

Melocactus lanssensianus is a species of plant in the family Cactaceae. It is endemic to Brazil. Its natural habitats are rocky areas and hot deserts. It is threatened by habitat loss.
