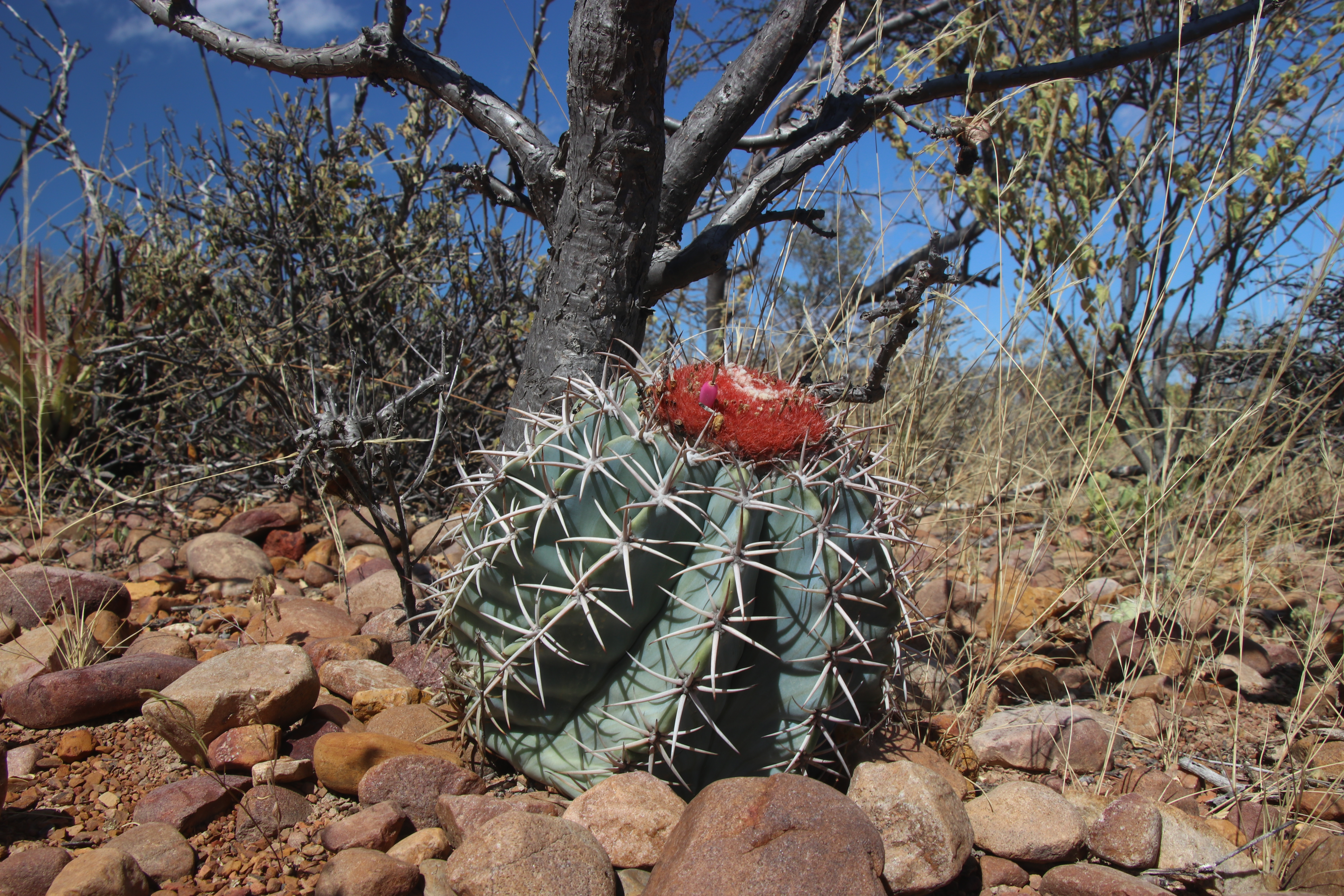

Scientific classification
- Kingdom: Plantae
- Clade: Tracheophytes
- Clade: Angiosperms
- Clade: Eudicots
- Order: Caryophyllales
- Family: Cactaceae
- Subfamily: Cactoideae
- Genus: Melocactus
- Species: M. zehntneri

Binomial name
- Melocactus zehntneri (Britton & Rose) Luetzelb.

= Melocactus zehntneri =

Species of cactus

Melocactus zehnerii is a Turk's turban cactus native to the state of Bahia, in north eastern Brazil. It is also known as Melocactus giganteus and Cactus zehntneri. Like other Turk's turbans, it has a roundish lower body with typically about eleven vertical ribs which does the photosynthesis and an elongated upper body, the cephalum, which is a type of capitate inflorescence. Its phyllotaxis is much higher; usually 34/55. This upper cephalum can grow as much as 72 cm (28 in) in length, and displaying as many as 16 annual rings. one of the longest living of all inflorescences known. This species was discovered in 1968 by Leopoldo Horst and A.F.H. Buining.
