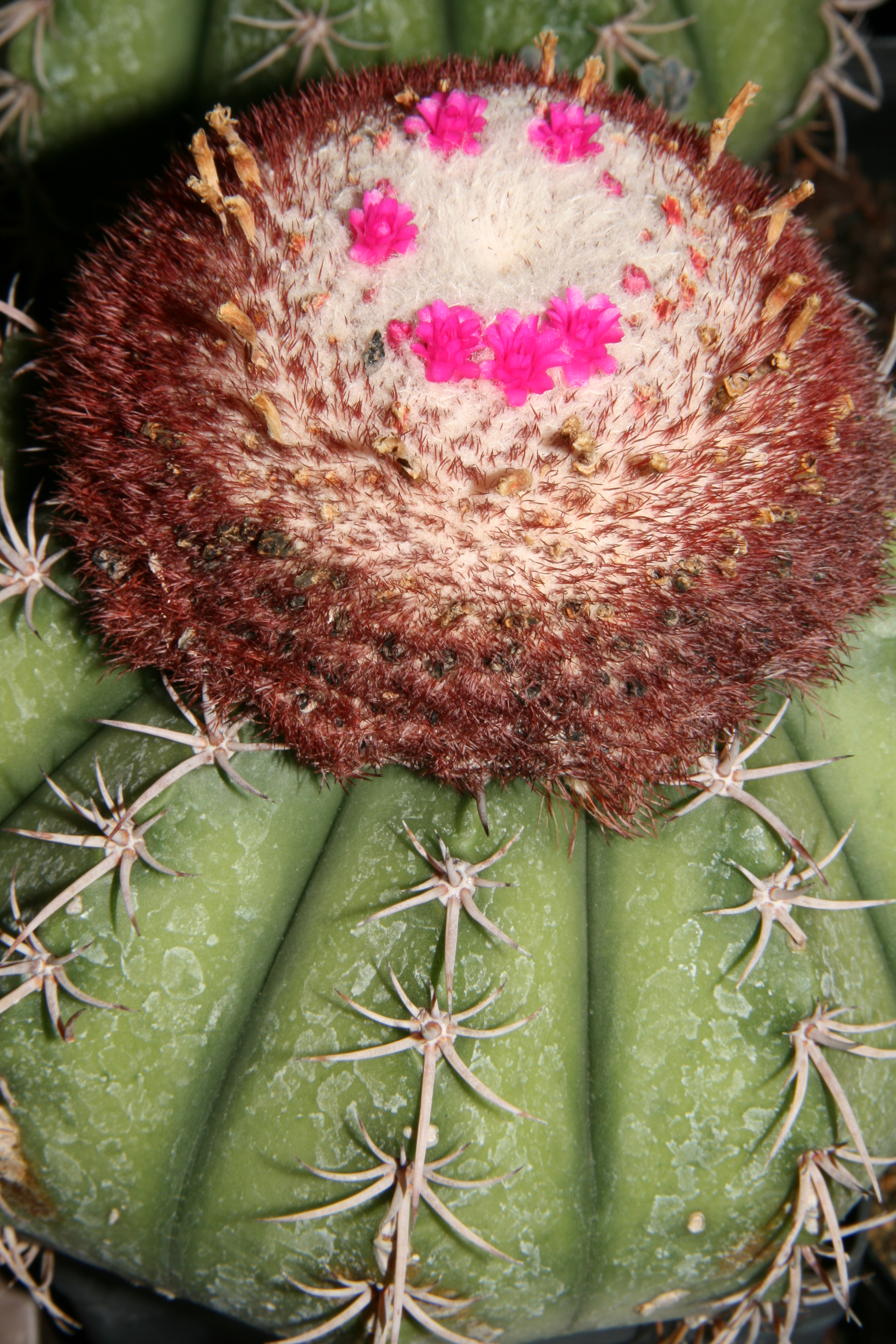

Conservation status
- Critically Endangered (IUCN 3.1)

Scientific classification
- Kingdom: Plantae
- Clade: Tracheophytes
- Clade: Angiosperms
- Clade: Eudicots
- Order: Caryophyllales
- Family: Cactaceae
- Subfamily: Cactoideae
- Genus: Melocactus
- Species: M. braunii

Binomial name
- Melocactus braunii Esteves

Synonyms
- Melocactus conoideus subsp. braunii (Esteves) Guiggi 2004

= Melocactus braunii =

Species of cactus

Melocactus braunii is a species of Melocactus found in Brazil.
