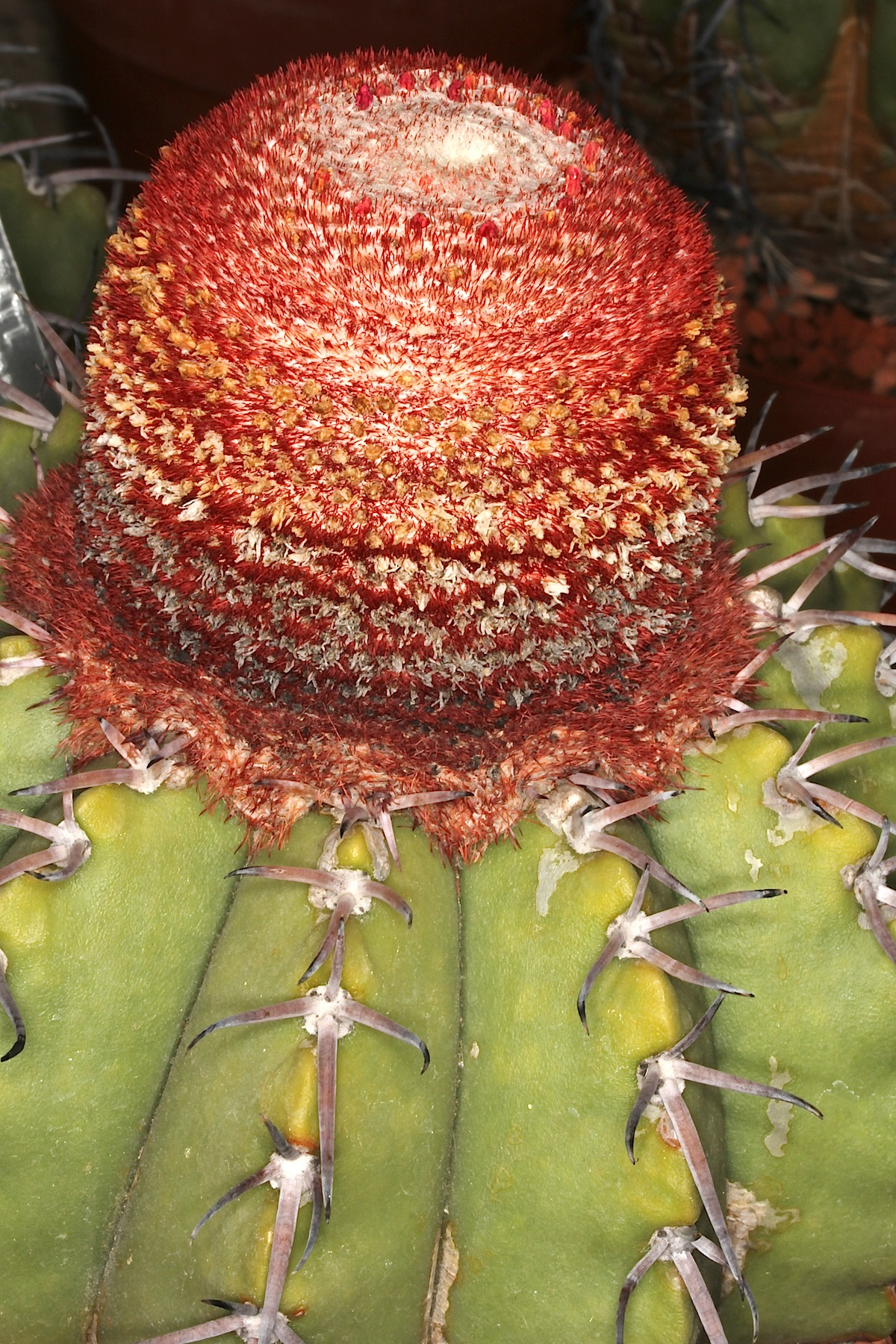

Conservation status
- Least Concern (IUCN 3.1)
- CITES Appendix I (CITES)

Scientific classification
- Kingdom: Plantae
- Clade: Tracheophytes
- Clade: Angiosperms
- Clade: Eudicots
- Order: Caryophyllales
- Family: Cactaceae
- Subfamily: Cactoideae
- Genus: Melocactus
- Species: M. paucispinus

Binomial name
- Melocactus paucispinus Heimen & R.J.Paul

= Melocactus paucispinus =

Species of cactus

Melocactus paucispinus is a species of cactus. It is endemic to Brazil, where it is known only from Bahia. Its populations are scattered in sand and gravel substrates.
