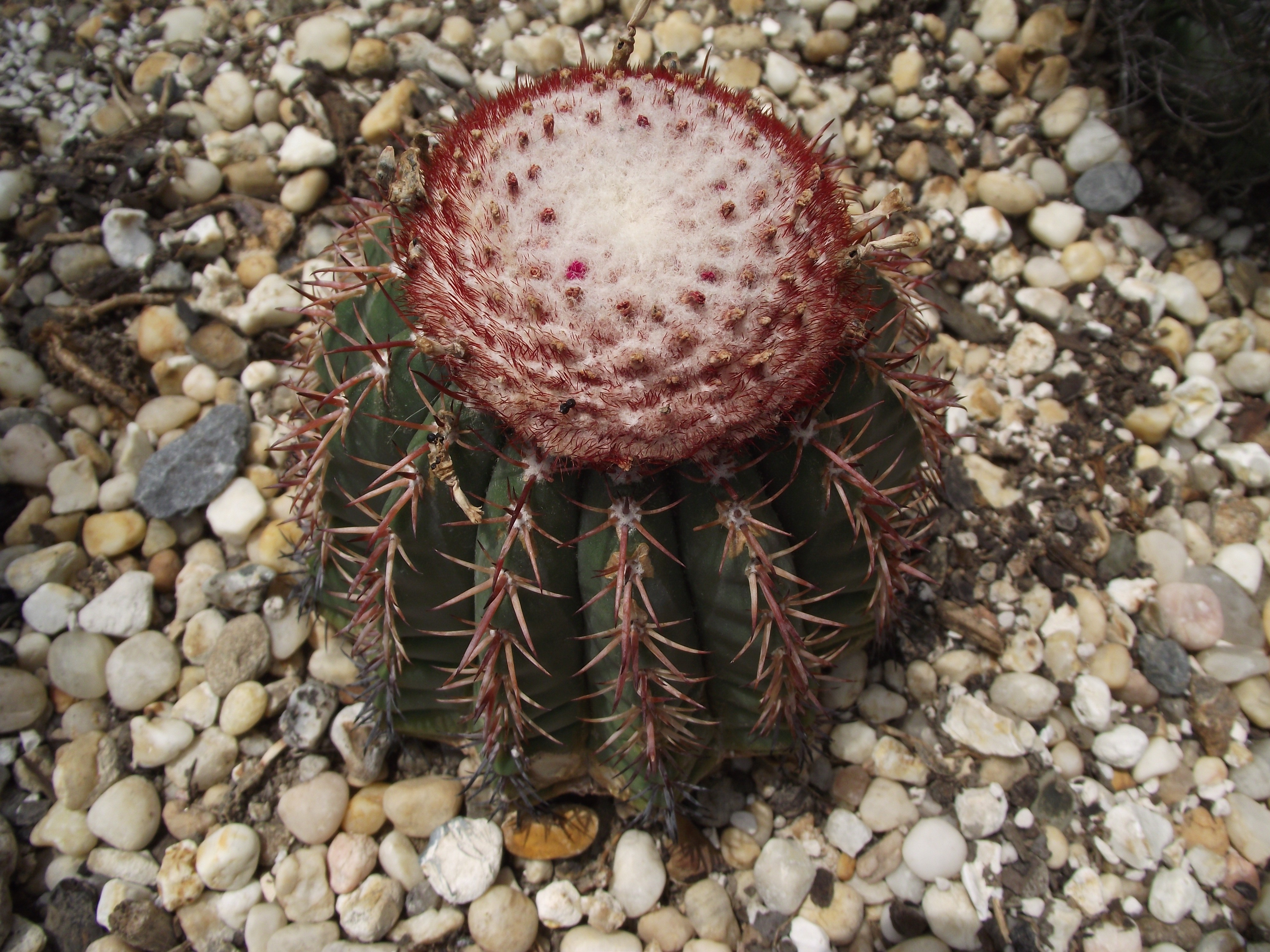

Conservation status
- Critically Endangered (IUCN 3.1)
- CITES Appendix I

Scientific classification
- Kingdom: Plantae
- Clade: Tracheophytes
- Clade: Angiosperms
- Clade: Eudicots
- Order: Caryophyllales
- Family: Cactaceae
- Subfamily: Cactoideae
- Genus: Melocactus
- Species: M. conoideus

Binomial name
- Melocactus conoideus Buining & Brederoo

= Melocactus conoideus =

Species of cactus

Melocactus conoideus is a species of plant in the family Cactaceae. It is a succulent cactus subshrub endemic to northeastern Brazil. It is native to the Serra do Periperi of Vitória da Conquista municipality in southwestern Bahia state. It grows in the transition from eastern Caatinga dry shrubland to campo rupestre montane savanna from 1,000 to 1,200 meters elevation. This species spreads by bearing fruit with seeds that ants take and transport to other locations that it can grow.

It is threatened by habitat loss, and the IUCN Red List assesses the species as Critically Endangered.
