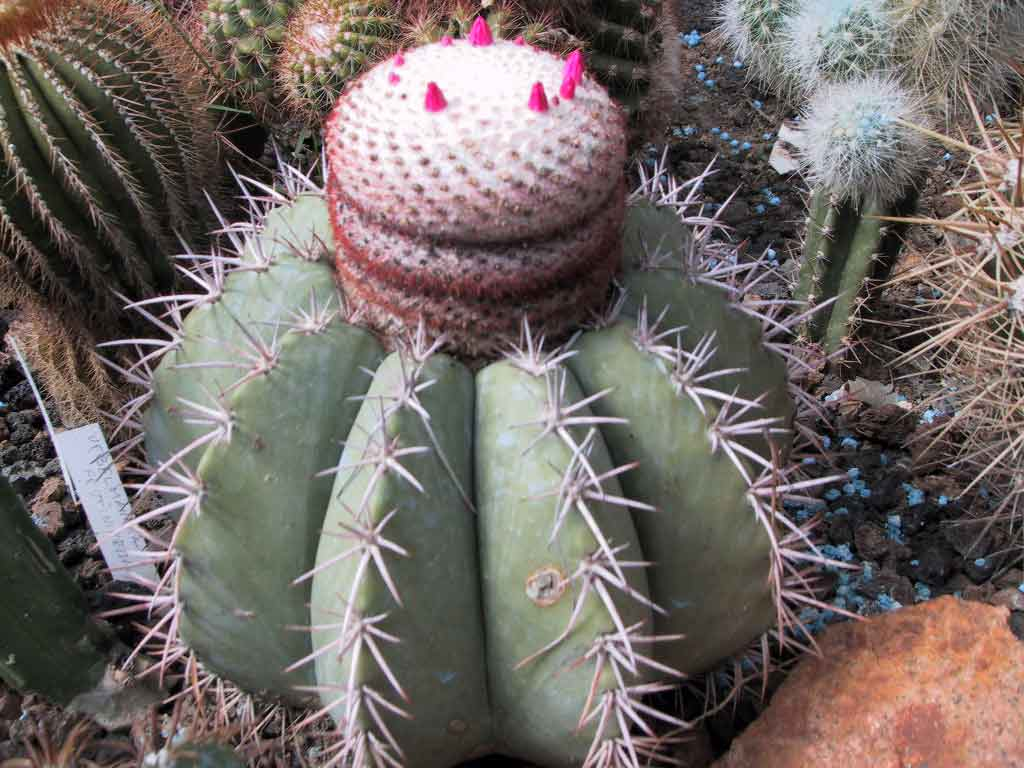

Conservation status
- Least Concern (IUCN 3.1)

Scientific classification
- Kingdom: Plantae
- Clade: Tracheophytes
- Clade: Angiosperms
- Clade: Eudicots
- Order: Caryophyllales
- Family: Cactaceae
- Subfamily: Cactoideae
- Genus: Melocactus
- Species: M. levitestatus

Binomial name
- Melocactus levitestatus Buining & Brederoo

Synonyms
- List: Melocactus diersianus Buining & Brederoo 1975; Melocactus diersianus f. rubrispinus (F.Ritter) P.J.Braun 1988; Melocactus levitestatus f. securituberculatus (Buining & Brederoo) P.J.Braun & Esteves 2001 publ. 2002; Melocactus rubrispinus F.Ritter 1979; Melocactus securituberculatus Buining & Brederoo 1976; Melocactus uebelmannii P.J.Braun 1985; Melocactus warasii E.Pereira & Buenecker 1977

= Melocactus levitestatus =

Species of cactus

Melocactus levitestatus is a species of cactus of the genus Melocactus found in Brazil.

== Description ==
Melocactus levitestatus features depressed, spherical to cylindrical shoots that grow 15–68 cm (6–27 in) tall and 14–30 cm (5.5–11.8 in) in diameter, with 9-15 sharp-edged ribs. Seedlings may have hooked brownish-red, gray-tinged spines. Central spines are 1.7–3.3 cm (0.7–1.3 in) long and are ascending or occasionally curved downward; radial spines of 2.2–3.3 cm (0.9–1.3 in) in length are strongly recurved, totaling 7–10. The bright red bristly cephalium reaches 18 cm (7.1 in) in height and 7–12 cm (2.8–4.7 in) in diameter.

Flowers are uniformly red or externally red with deep magenta interior, measuring 2–2.7 cm (0.8–1.1 in) long and 0.6–0.9 cm (0.24–0.35 in) in diameter. Fruits are white or light pink, club-shaped, 1.2–2.4 cm (0.5–0.9 in) long.

== Distribution ==
This species is native to southern and western Bahia, northern to central Minas Gerais, Tocantins, and Goiás in Brazil at elevations between 450 and 870 m (1,480 and 2,850 ft). Plants are found growing in limestone soil in seasonal dried forest.

== Taxonomy ==
First described in 1973 by Buining and Brederoo, the name "levitestatus" derives from Latin, meaning "smooth seed coat."
