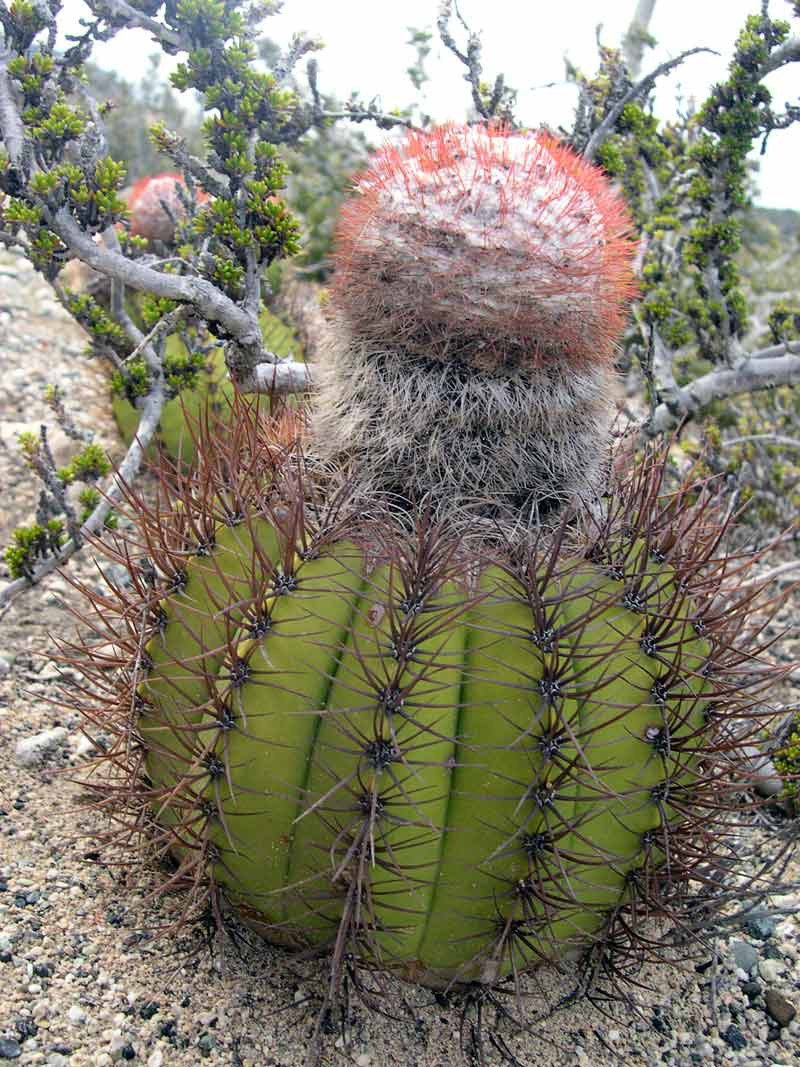

Conservation status
- Least Concern (IUCN 3.1)

Scientific classification
- Kingdom: Plantae
- Clade: Tracheophytes
- Clade: Angiosperms
- Clade: Eudicots
- Order: Caryophyllales
- Family: Cactaceae
- Subfamily: Cactoideae
- Genus: Melocactus
- Species: M. harlowii

Binomial name
- Melocactus harlowii (Britton & Rose) Vaupel

Synonyms
- Cactus harlowii Britton & Rose 1912; Melocactus acunae var. flavispinus Z.Mészáros 1976 publ. 1977), no type indicated; Melocactus borhidii Z.Mészáros 1976 publ. 1977; Melocactus harlowii subsp. borhidii (Z.Mészáros) Kunte 2013

= Melocactus harlowii =

Species of cactus

Melocactus harlowii is a species of Melocactus found in Cuba.
