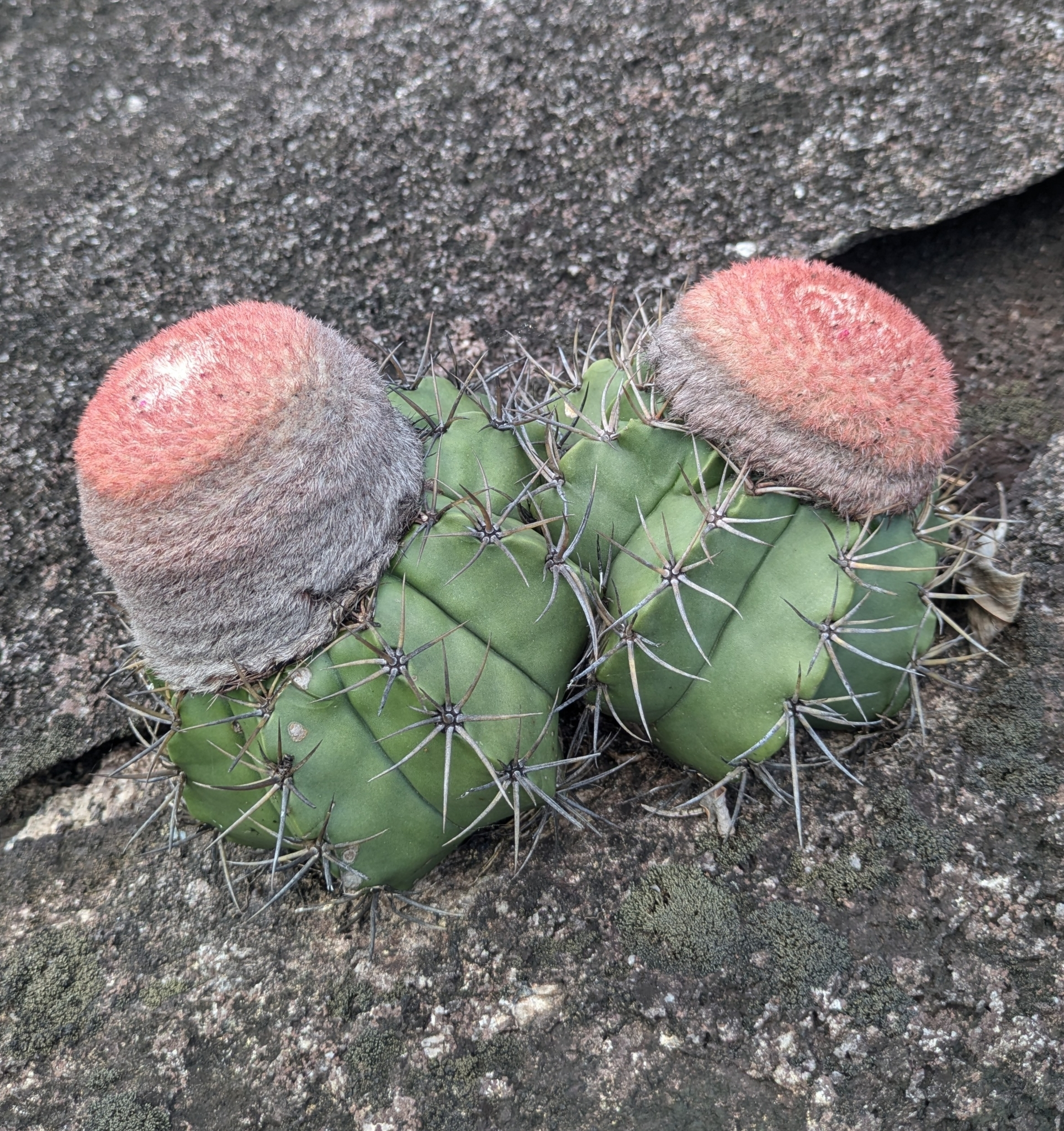

Conservation status
- Least Concern (IUCN 3.1)

Scientific classification
- Kingdom: Plantae
- Clade: Embryophytes
- Clade: Tracheophytes
- Clade: Angiosperms
- Clade: Eudicots
- Order: Caryophyllales
- Family: Cactaceae
- Subfamily: Cactoideae
- Genus: Melocactus
- Species: M. neryi

Binomial name
- Melocactus neryi K.Schum.

= Melocactus neryi =

Species of flowering plant

Melocactus neryi is a species of flowering plant from the genus Melocactus.

== Description ==
Melocactus neryi grows with dark blue-green to yellowish green, depressed spherical shoots that reach heights of growth of 5.5 to 18 centimeters (2.2 to 7.1 in) with a diameter of 7 to 20 cm (2.75 to 7.9 in). There are nine to 15 sharp-edged ribs. The initially dark brown to yellowish brown thorns turn reddish brown with age and are thickly tinged with whitish gray. The mostly single central spine is curved upwards and is 1 to 2.5 cm (0.4 to 1 in) long. The up to 2.9 cm (1.14 in) long six to ten radial spines are curved. The cephalium, which consists of fine, dense, reddish to slightly orange-red bristles, is up to 5 cm high and has a diameter of 4 to 9 cm (1.6 to 3.54 in).

The pink to slightly crimson flowers are 4.6–5.6 cm (1.8–2.2 in) long and have a diameter of 0.8–1 cm (0.3–0.4 in). Sometimes they hardly protrude from the cephalium. The pink to lilac-pink fruits are 1–2 cm (0.4–0.8 in) long and sometimes flattened.
