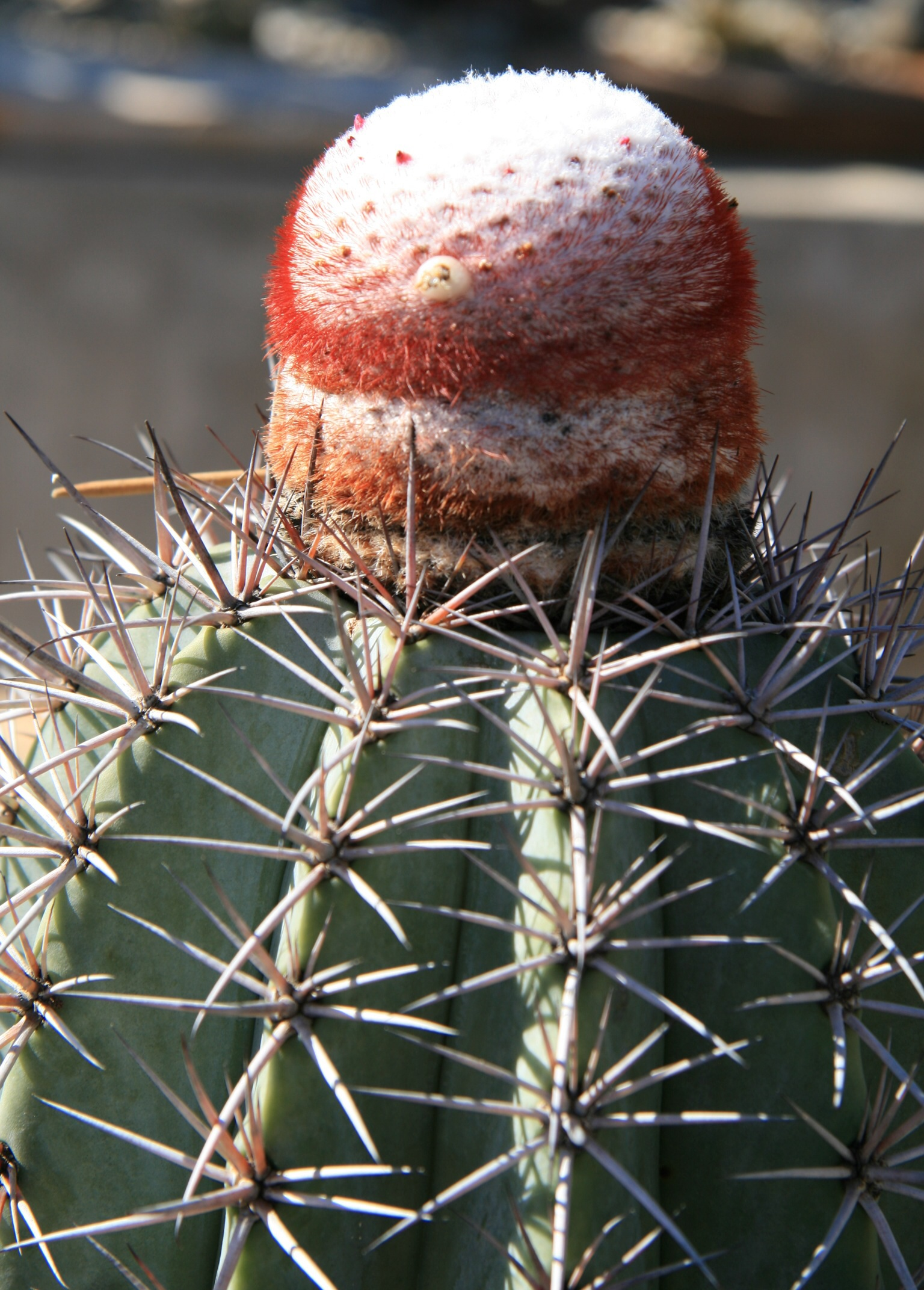

Conservation status
- Endangered (IUCN 3.1)

Scientific classification
- Kingdom: Plantae
- Clade: Embryophytes
- Clade: Tracheophytes
- Clade: Spermatophytes
- Clade: Angiosperms
- Clade: Eudicots
- Order: Caryophyllales
- Family: Cactaceae
- Subfamily: Cactoideae
- Genus: Melocactus
- Species: M. azureus

Binomial name
- Melocactus azureus Buining & Brederoo

= Melocactus azureus =

Species of cactus

Melocactus azureus is a species of cactus. It is endemic to Brazil, where it is known only from Bahia. It is locally abundant but the populations are fragmented and vulnerable to habitat degradation.

== Description ==
Melocactus azureus has a striking frosty blue epidermis. Its cylindrical stem is(9-)14-30(-45cm) tall and 14-20 centimeters in diameter, green, grey-green, but never glaucous like subspecies Melocactus azureus ferreophilus with mucilage present in the cortical tissues. It has 9-10 ribs and the spines are black to reddish, overlaid with gray, and some are hooked in seedlings while the central spines are slightly curved to straight and the radial spines are very stout. The flowers are small, 15-23mm long and 4-11 mm in diameter, and pink to magenta, it flowers in spring to late autumn. The fruits are small, white to able pink and seeds are smooth. It has the chromosome number 2n = 44.

== Habitat ==
Melocactus azureus is endemic to central, northern, and eastern Brazil at altitudes of 450-800 metres above sea level. This species has a small range and is only in low-lying outcrops of limestone, tt occurs in fragmented populations from a few hundred to millions. A major threat to the species is habitat loss for agriculture, vegetation is destroyed when the surrounding caatinga forest is cleared causing a decline of wild populations. The change has an impact on the outcrops were the species grows as well, making them prone to invasive species.

== Cultivation ==
Melocactus azureus has a relatively rapid growth rate given the best conditions. These tropical cacti are not recommended for beginners as they are not easy to grow. It grows well in very porous standard cactus mix soil, this cactus preferes very bright light however not as much as most arid growing cacti.

== Subspecies ==
- Melocactus azureus subsp. ferreophilus (Buining & Brederoo) N.P.Taylor
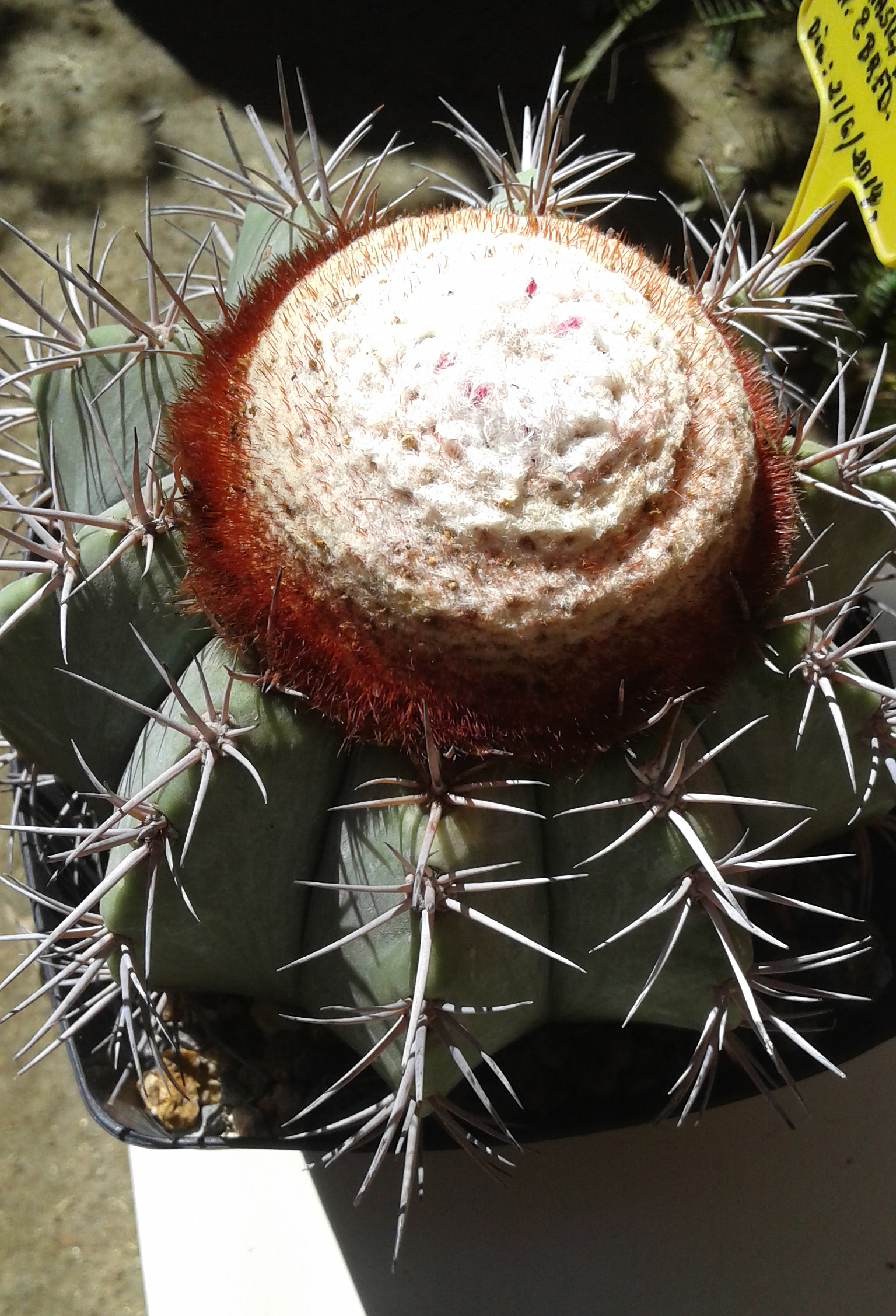

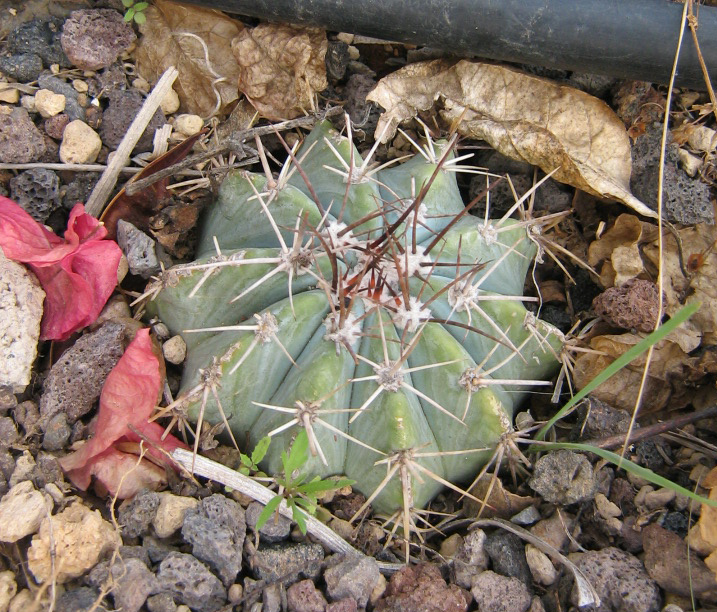

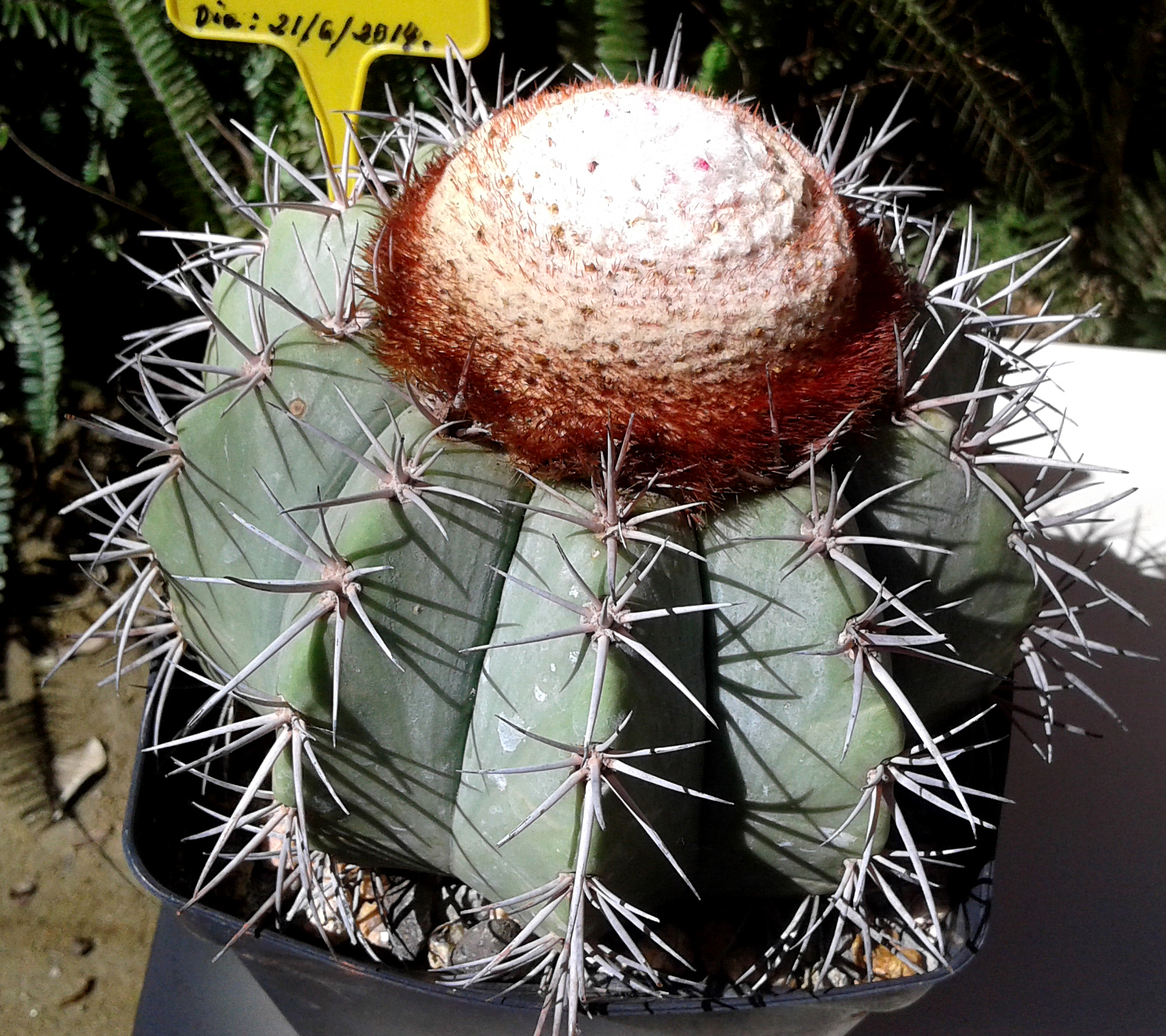
