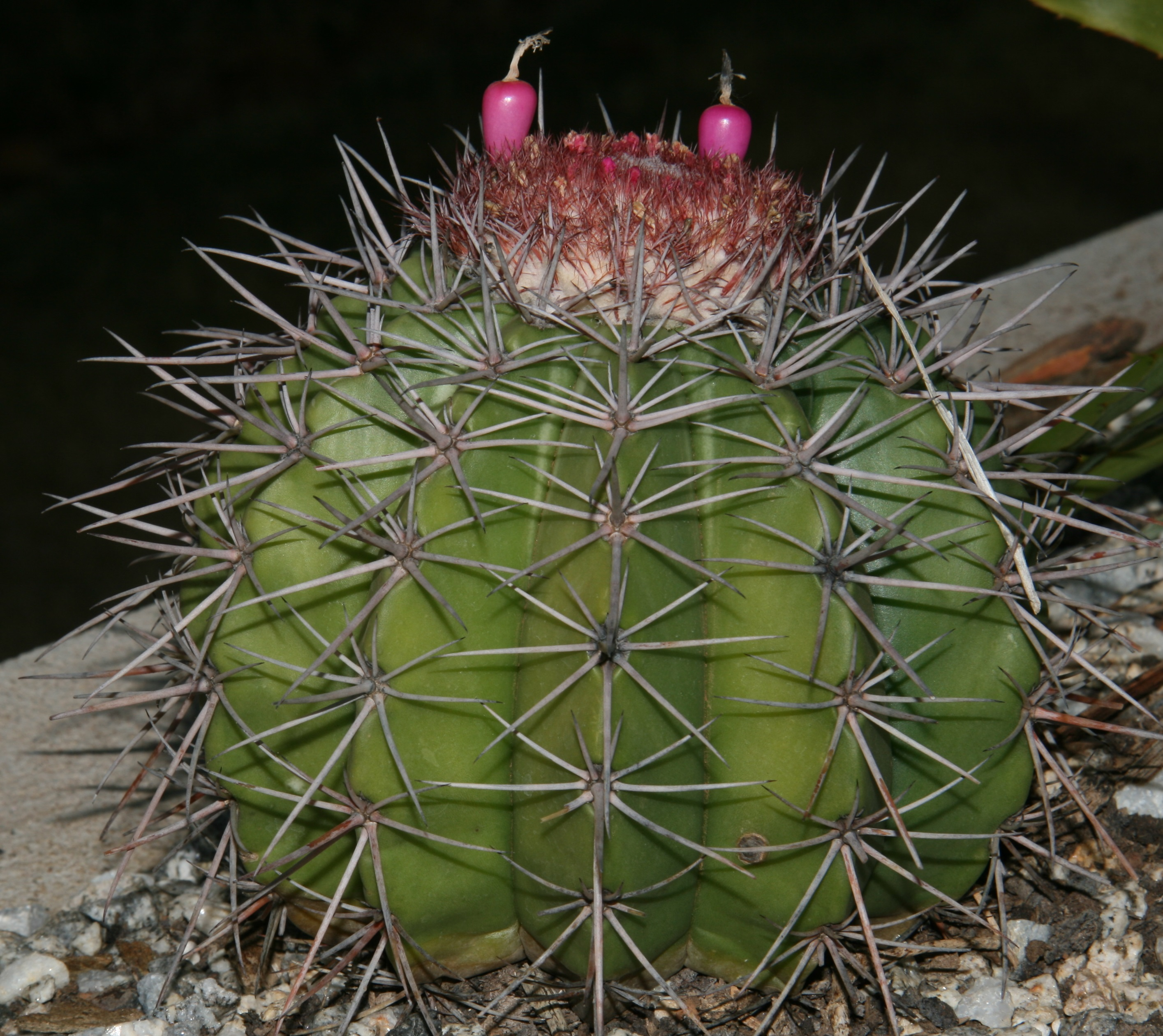

Conservation status
- Least Concern (IUCN 3.1)

Scientific classification
- Kingdom: Plantae
- Clade: Tracheophytes
- Clade: Angiosperms
- Clade: Eudicots
- Order: Caryophyllales
- Family: Cactaceae
- Subfamily: Cactoideae
- Genus: Melocactus
- Species: M. bahiensis

Binomial name
- Melocactus bahiensis (Britton & Rose) Luetzelb. 1926

= Melocactus bahiensis =

Species of cactus

Melocactus bahiensis is a species of Melocactus found in Bahia, Brazil.

== Description ==
Melocactus bahiensis grows with light to dark green, spherical, depressed spherical or pyramidal shoots that reach heights of 9.5 to 21 centimeters with diameters of 11 to 21 centimeters. There are eight to 14 low, differently shaped ribs. Some of the brown, reddish or yellow thorns tinged with gray are bent or hooked in young plants. The one to four central spines are mostly straight and 1.7 to 5 inches long. There are seven to twelve radial spines, mostly straight, that are up to 6 centimeters long. The mostly small cephalium is up to 5 centimeters high and reaches a diameter of 6.5 to 8.5 centimeters.

The more or less pink-magenta colored flowers are 2 to 2.3 centimeters long and have a diameter of 1 to 1.25 centimeters. The fruits are reddish to magenta and lighter underneath.

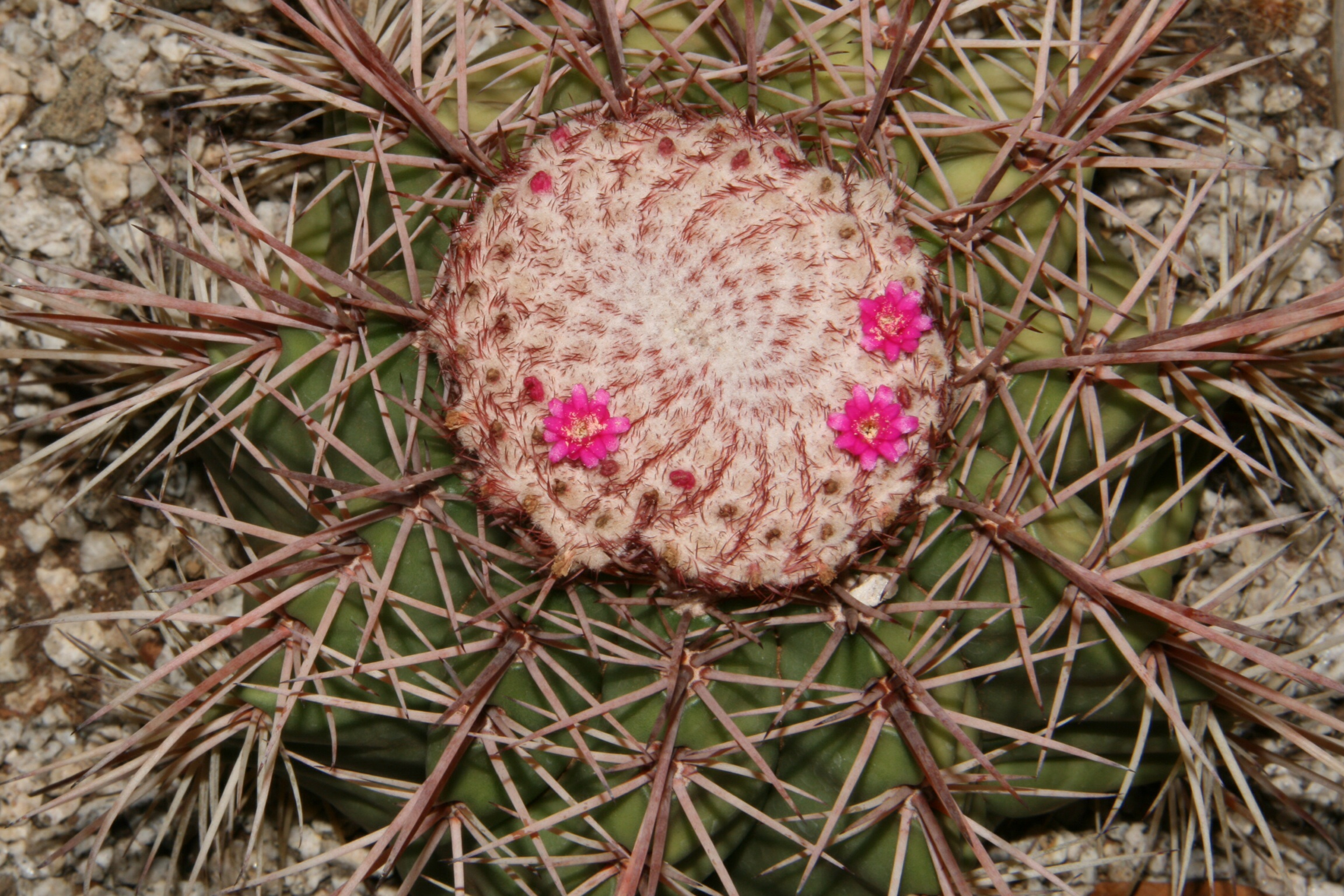
Flowers

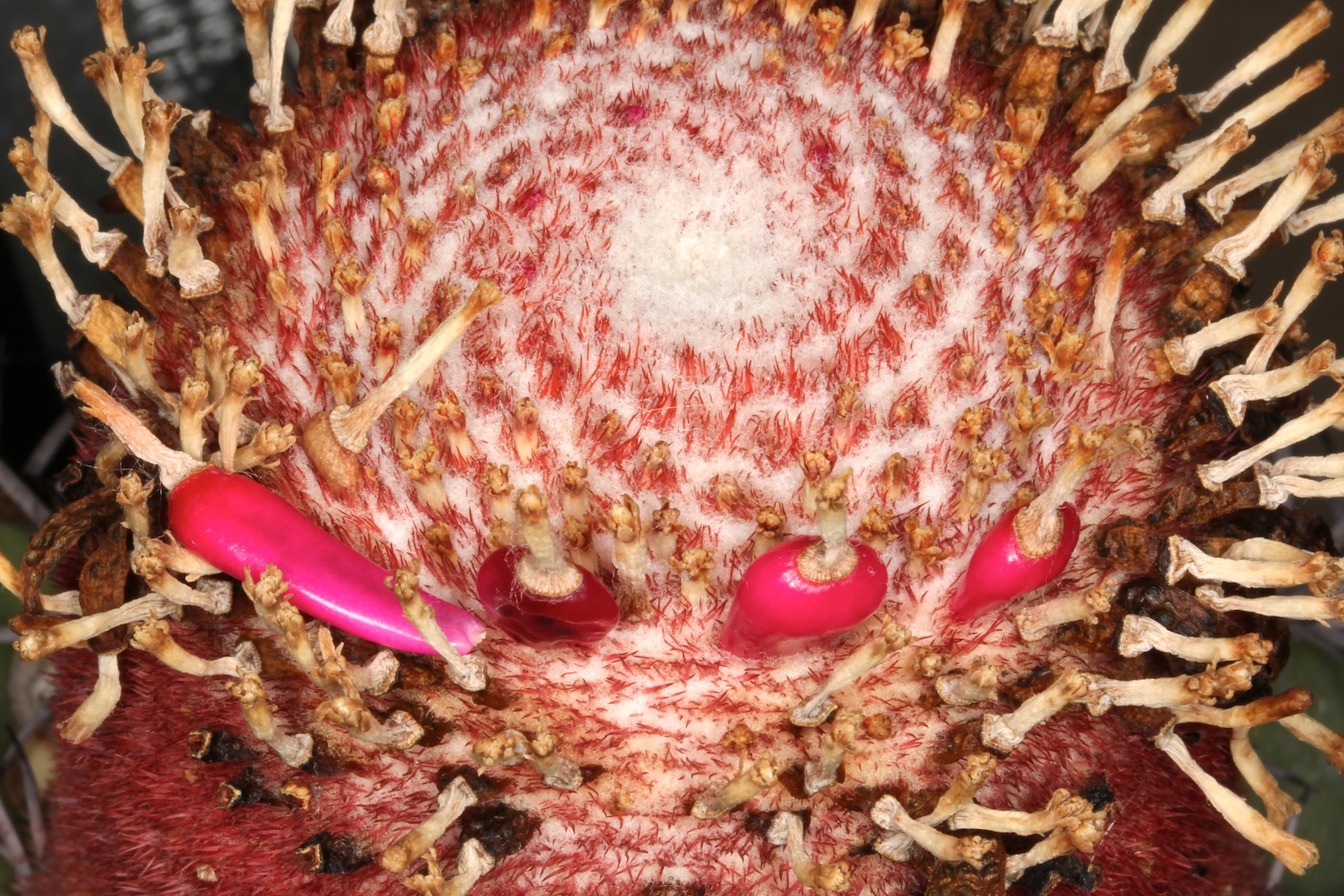
Fruit

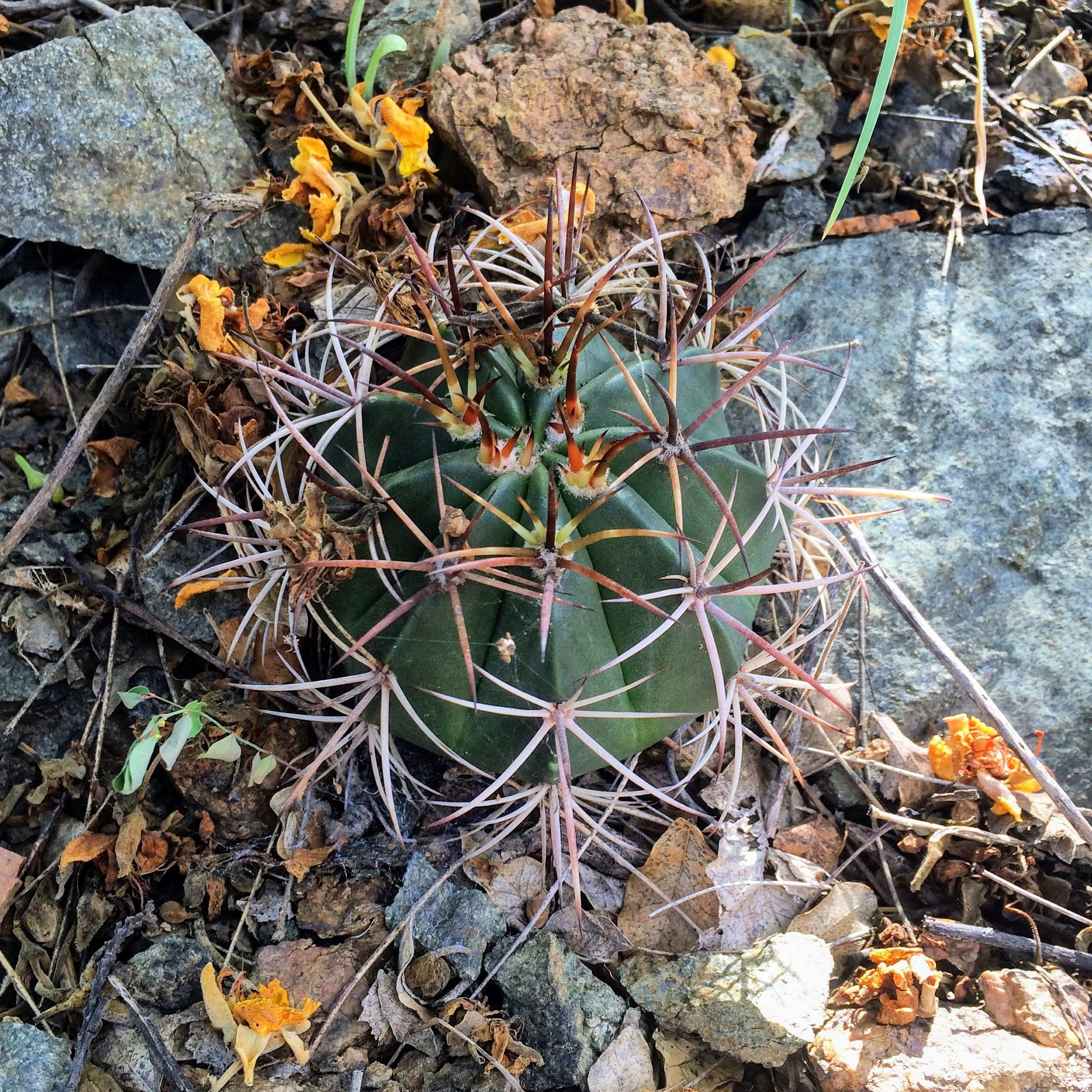
Young plant

== Distribution ==
Melocactus bahiensis is distributed in the Brazilian states of Pernambuco, Bahia and Minas Gerais.

== Taxonomy ==
The first description as Cactus bahiensis was in 1922 by Nathaniel Lord Britton and Joseph Nelson Rose. Philipp von Luetzelburg placed the species in the genus Melocactus in 1923.
