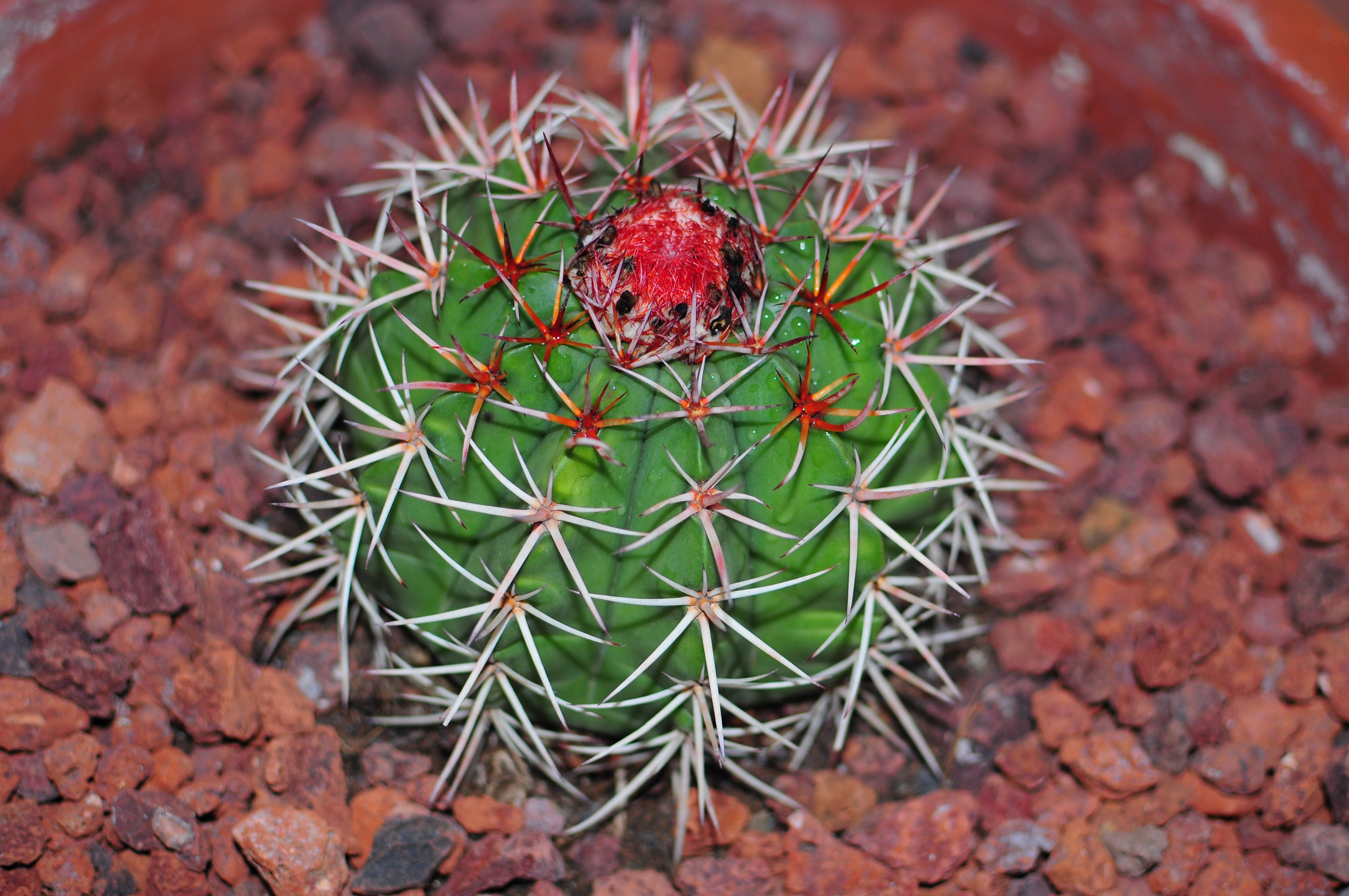

Conservation status
- Vulnerable (IUCN 3.1)

Scientific classification
- Kingdom: Plantae
- Clade: Tracheophytes
- Clade: Angiosperms
- Clade: Eudicots
- Order: Caryophyllales
- Family: Cactaceae
- Subfamily: Cactoideae
- Genus: Melocactus
- Species: M. pachyacanthus

Binomial name
- Melocactus pachyacanthus Buining & Brederoo

= Melocactus pachyacanthus =

Species of cactus

Melocactus pachyacanthus is a species of cactus. It is endemic to Brazil, where it is known only from two locations in Bahia. Its populations are fragmented and it is vulnerable to habitat degradation.
