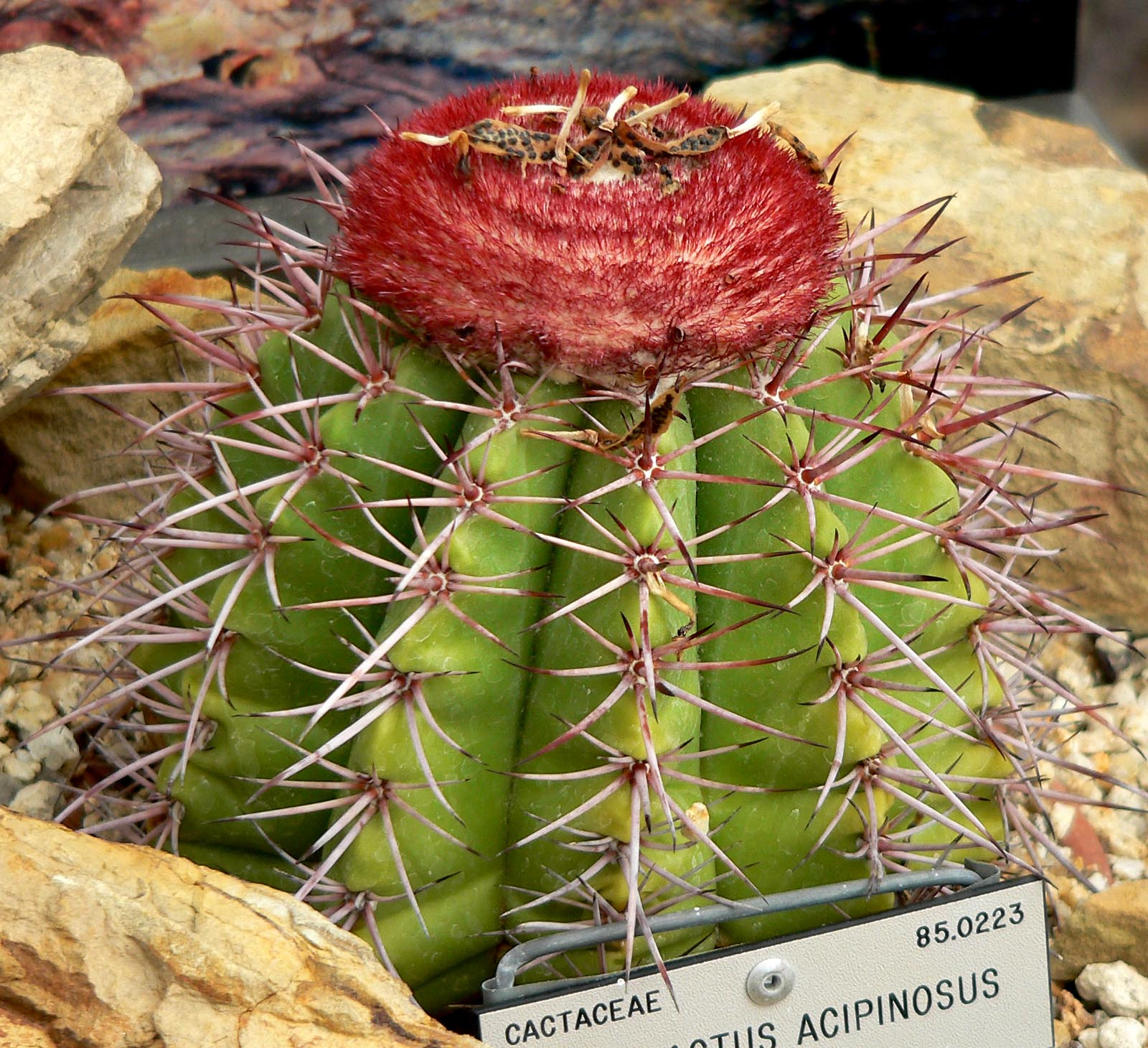
- Melocactus bahiensis

Scientific classification
- Kingdom: Plantae
- Clade: Tracheophytes
- Clade: Angiosperms
- Clade: Eudicots
- Order: Caryophyllales
- Family: Cactaceae
- Subfamily: Cactoideae
- Tribe: Cereeae
- Subtribe: Cereinae
- Genus: Melocactus; Link & Otto, nom. cons.

Type species
- Melocactus communis (now Melocactus intortus)

Species
- See text.

= Melocactus =

Genus of cacti

Melocactus (melon cactus), also known as the Turk's head cactus, Turk's cap cactus, or Pope's head cactus, is a genus of cactus with about 30–40 species. They are native to the Caribbean, western Mexico through Central America to northern South America, with some species along the Andes down to southern Peru, and a concentration of species in northeastern Brazil.

The first species was named by Carl Linnaeus in 1753, as Cactus melocactus. When the genus was separated from Cactus, the pre-Linnaean name Melocactus was used. Acting on the principle of priority, in 1922 Nathaniel Britton and Joseph Rose resurrected Linnaeus' Cactus. However, the 1905 Vienna botanical congress had already rejected the name Cactus, so this name was not available, and Melocactus Link & Otto is the correct genus name.

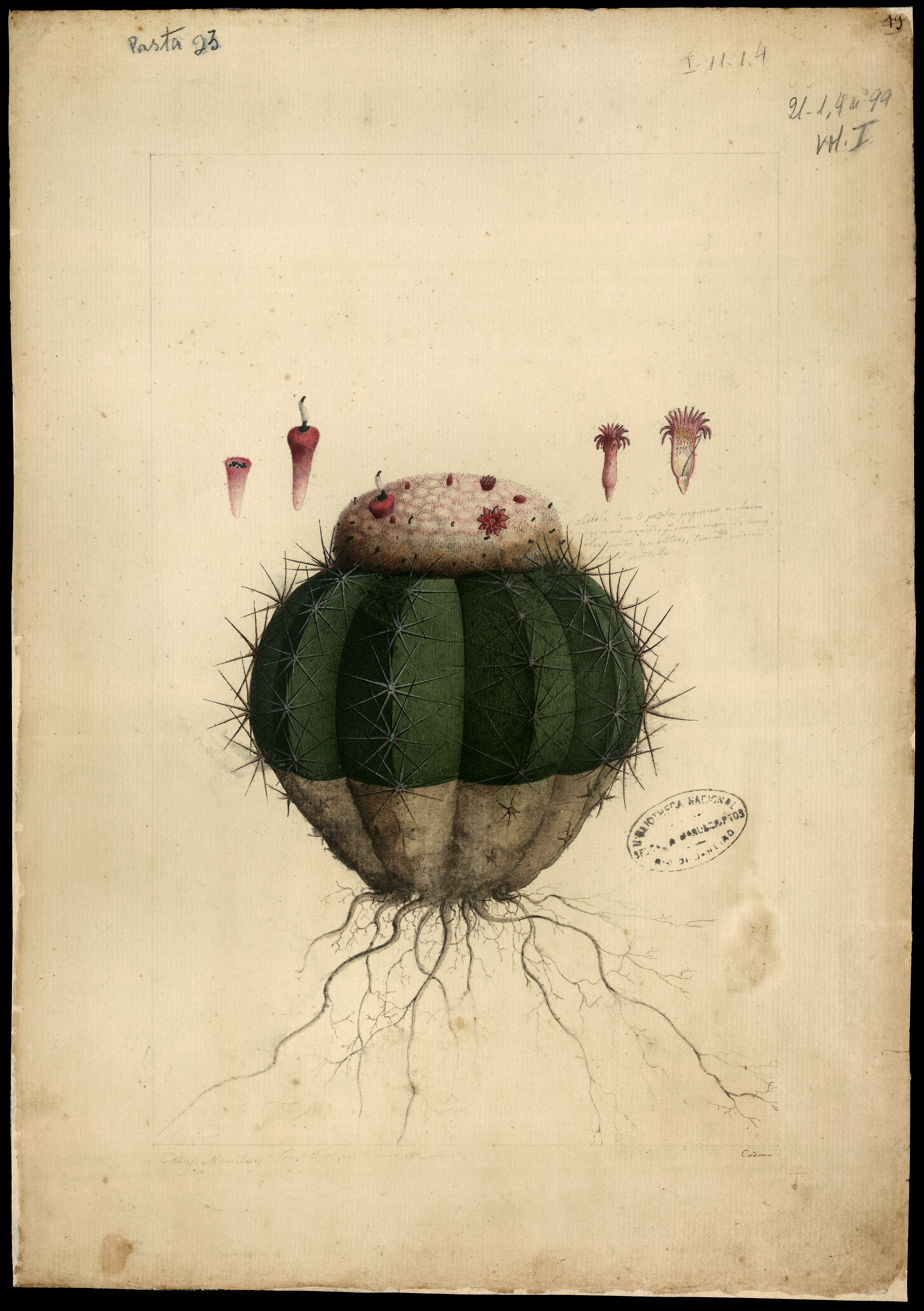
A Cactae melocactus depicted by Joaquim José Codina in the 18th century.

Mature plants are easily recognizable by their cephalium, a wool- and bristle-coated structure at the apex of the plant, containing a mass of areoles from which the small flowers grow. The red, wool-coated cephalium, said to resemble the fez worn by Turkish men during the late Ottoman Empire, gives the plant one of its common names, Turk's cap cactus. It gives its name to the Turks Islands, part of the Turks and Caicos Islands.

The fruits of Melocactus are pink and resemble the shape of pepper fruits. The fruits of this genus are edible, and in the wild they are frequently dispersed by lizards and birds.

== Species ==
As of October 2026, Plants of the World Online accepted the following species:

Species
Image	Scientific name	Distribution
	Melocactus acunae León	Eastern Cuba
	Melocactus andinus R.Gruber ex N.P.Taylor	Venezuela
	Melocactus azureus Buining & Brederoo	Brazil (Bahia)
	Melocactus bahiensis (Britton & Rose) Luetzelb.	Brazil (Bahia)
	Melocactus bellavistensis Rauh & Backeb.	Ecuador and Peru
	Melocactus braunii Esteves	Brazil (Bahia)
	Melocactus brederooianus Buining	Brazil (Bahia)
	Melocactus broadwayi (Britton & Rose) A.Berger	Trinidad & Tobago
	Melocactus caroli-linnaei N.P.Taylor	Jamaica
	Melocactus conoideus Buining & Brederoo	Brazil
	Melocactus curvispinus Pfeiff.	Mexico, Central America, Colombia and western Venezuela
	Melocactus deinacanthus Buining & Brederoo	Brazil
	Melocactus ernestii Vaupel	Brazil (Bahia and Minas Gerais.)
	Melocactus estevesii P.J.Braun	Brazil (Roraima)
	Melocactus evae Z.Mészáros	Southeastern Cuba
	Melocactus ferreophilus Buining & Brederoo	Brazil (Bahia)
	Melocactus glaucescens Buining & Brederoo	Brazil
	Melocactus harlowii (Britton & Rose) Vaupel	Cuba
	Melocactus holguinensis Areces	Cuba
	Melocactus inconcinnus Buining & Brederoo	Northeastern Brazil
	Melocactus intortus (Mill.) Urb.	Bahamas to Turks-Caicos Islands, Puerto Rico to Lesser Antilles
	Melocactus lagunaensis (Z.Mészáros) D.Barrios & Majure	Southeastern Cuba
	Melocactus lanssensianus P.J.Braun	Brazil (Pernambuco)
	Melocactus lemairei (Monv. ex Lem.) Miq. ex Lem.	Hispaniola (NW. Haiti, W. & Southern Dominican Republic)
	Melocactus levitestatus Buining & Brederoo	Central & Eastern Brazil
	Melocactus macracanthos (Salm-Dyck) Link & Otto	Aruba to Netherlands Antilles
	Melocactus matanzanus León	Cuba
	Melocactus mazelianus Ríha	Eastern Colombia to Venezuela
	Melocactus nagyi Z.Mészáros	Southeastern Cuba
	Melocactus natalensis (P.J.Braun & Esteves) N.P.Taylor	Brazil (Rio Grande do Norte)
	Melocactus neoviridescens Guiggi	Northeastern Brazil
	Melocactus neryi K.Schum.	Venezuela to N. Brazil
	Melocactus oreas Miq.	Brazil
	Melocactus pachyacanthus Buining & Brederoo	Brazil
	Melocactus paucispinus Heimen & R.J.Paul	Bahia, Brazil
	Melocactus pedernalensis M.M.Mejía & R.G.García	Southeastern Haiti to southwestern Dominican Republic
	Melocactus perezassoi Areces	Central Cuba
	Melocactus peruvianus Vaupel	Peru
	Melocactus praerupticola Areces	Dominican Republic
	Melocactus pruinosus Werderm.	Brazil (Bahia, Minas Gerais)
	Melocactus pseudoviolaceus Guiggi	Brazil (Bahia)
	Melocactus radoczii Z.Mészáros	Southeastern Cuba
	Melocactus salvadorensis Werderm.	Brazil (Southern Bahia, Minas Gerais)
	Melocactus santiagoensis D.Barrios & Majure	Cuba
	Melocactus schatzlii H.Till & R.Gruber	Venezuela (Mérida)
	Melocactus sergipensis N.P.Taylor & Meiado	Brazil (Sergipe)
	Melocactus smithii (Alexander) Buining ex G.D.Rowley	Brazil
	Melocactus stramineus Suringar	Aruba
	Melocactus violaceus Pfeiff.	Northeastern Brazil (to Northeastern Minas Gerais)
	Melocactus zehntneri (Britton & Rose) Luetzelb.	Northeastern Brazil

=== Natural hybrids ===
As of September 2023, Plants of the World Online accepted the following natural hybrids:

Image	Scientific name	Distribution
	Melocactus × albicephalus Buining & Brederoo	Brazil (Bahia)
	Melocactus × horridus Werderm.	Brazil (Pernambuco)
	Melocactus × trachycephalus Suringar	Aruba
