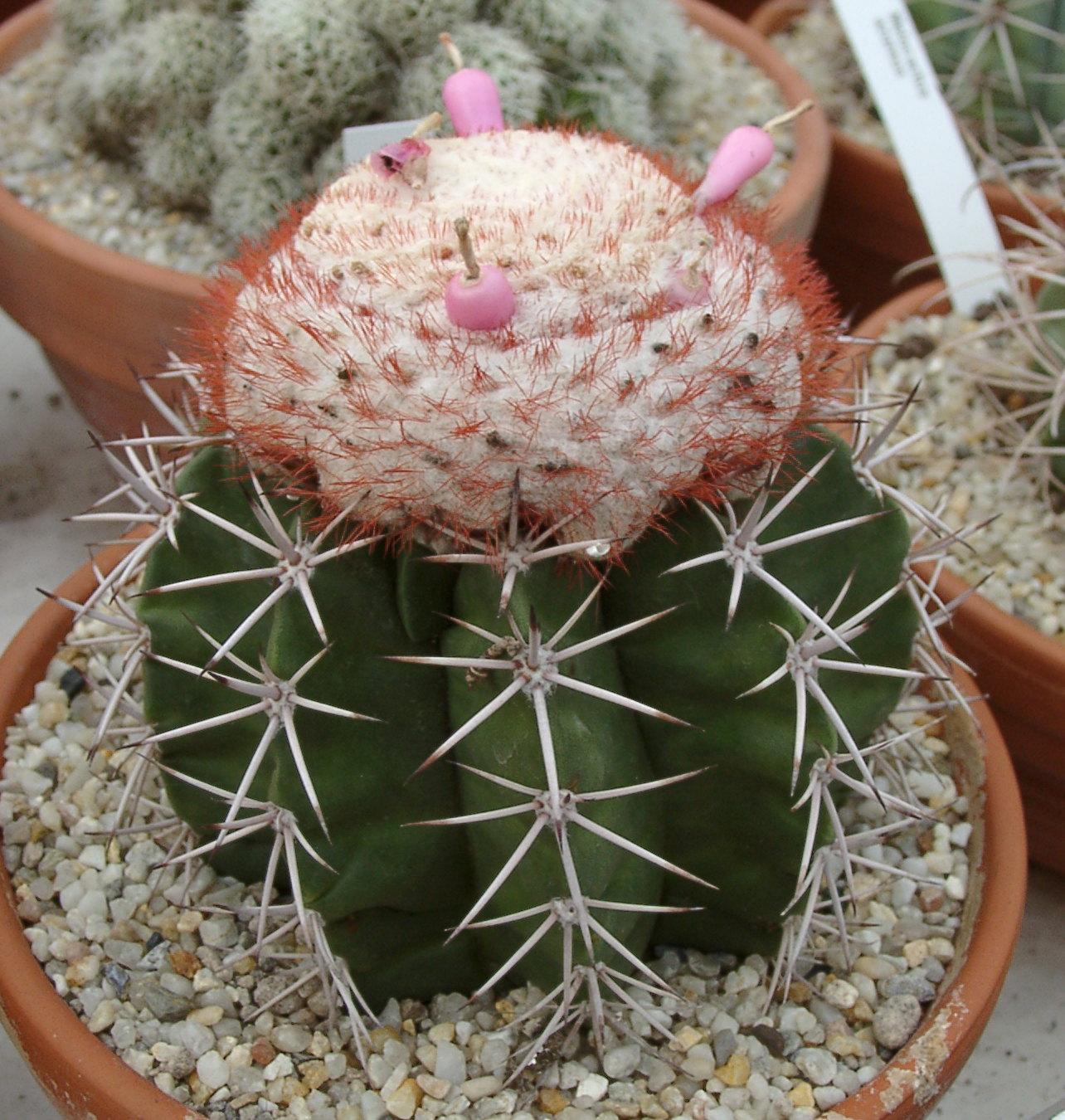

Conservation status
- Vulnerable (IUCN 3.1)

Scientific classification
- Kingdom: Plantae
- Clade: Tracheophytes
- Clade: Angiosperms
- Clade: Eudicots
- Order: Caryophyllales
- Family: Cactaceae
- Subfamily: Cactoideae
- Genus: Melocactus
- Species: M. violaceus

Binomial name
- Melocactus violaceus Pfeiff.

= Melocactus violaceus =

Species of cactus

Melocactus violaceus is a species of plant in the family Cactaceae. It is endemic to Brazil. Its natural habitats are dry savanna and sandy shores. It is threatened by habitat loss.

== Description ==
Melocactus violaceus has dark green bodies measuring 5–20 cm in height and 6–20 cm in diameter, with 5–15 ribs. It features slender, brownish spines with darker tips, often tinged with gray. Central spines are absent; radial spines number 5–8, are straight or slightly curved, and are 1.4–2.4 cm long, with the lowest reaching 3 cm. The cephalium, composed of light red bristles and white wool, is up to 6 cm tall and 3.5–8.5 cm in diameter.

The deep pink flowers emerge prominently from the cephalium, measuring 1.5–2.5 cm long and 6–14 mm wide. The fruits are 1.2–1.9 cm long and range from light pink to dark pink, lilac-pink, or white.

=== Subspecies ===
Accepted subspecies:

Image	Name	Distribution
	Melocactus violaceus subsp. margaritaceus N.P.Taylor	Brazil
	Melocactus violaceus subsp. ritteri N.P.Taylor	Brazil (E. Central Bahia)
	Melocactus violaceus subsp. violaceus	Brazil (to NE. Minas Gerais)

== Distribution ==
This species is native to northeastern Brazil.

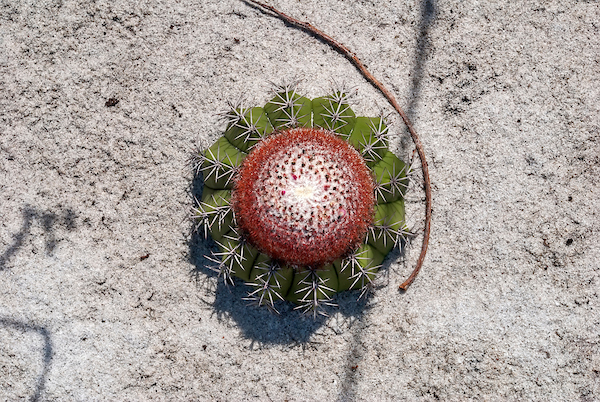
Plant growing in Guarapari, Espírito Santo

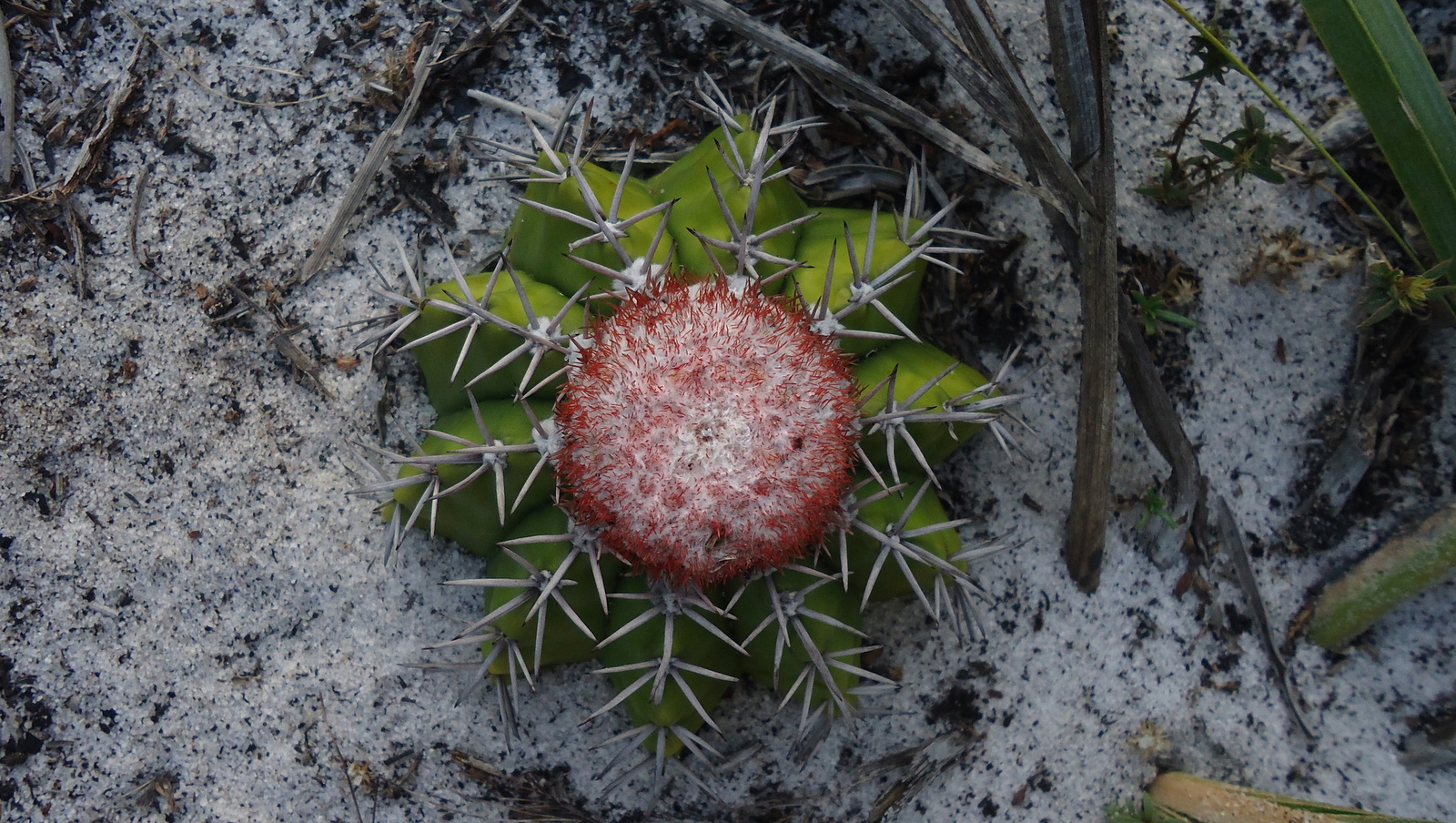
Plant growing in Bahia, Brazil

== Taxonomy ==
It was first described in 1835 by Ludwig Georg Karl Pfeiffer. The name "violaceus" refers to the violet hue of its young thorns.
