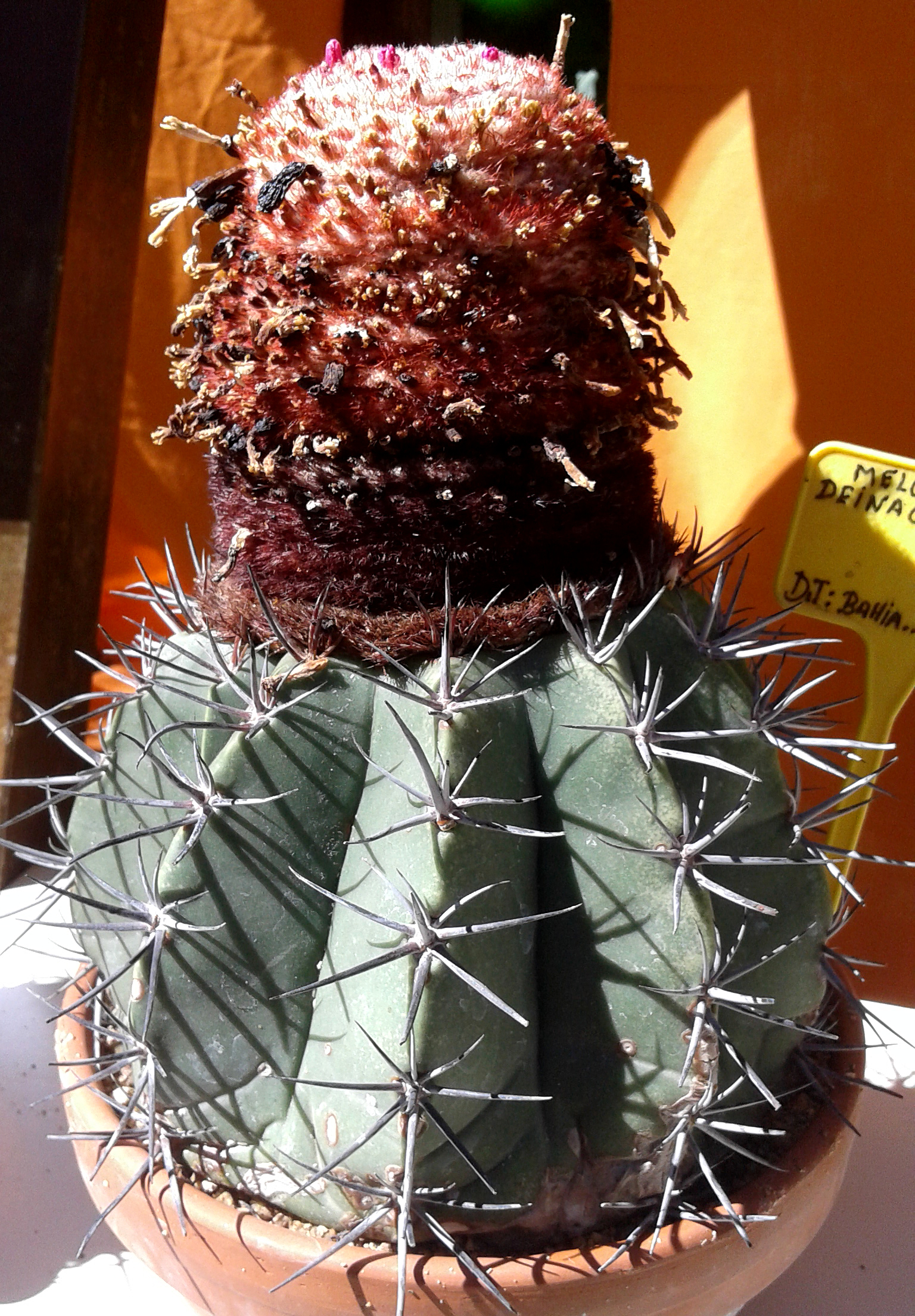

Conservation status
- Endangered (IUCN 3.1)
- CITES Appendix I

Scientific classification
- Kingdom: Plantae
- Clade: Embryophytes
- Clade: Tracheophytes
- Clade: Angiosperms
- Clade: Eudicots
- Order: Caryophyllales
- Family: Cactaceae
- Subfamily: Cactoideae
- Genus: Melocactus
- Species: M. deinacanthus

Binomial name
- Melocactus deinacanthus Buining & Brederoo

= Melocactus deinacanthus =

Species of cactus

Melocactus deinacanthus, also known as the Wonderfully Bristled Turk's-Cap Cactus is a species of plant in the family Cactaceae. It is endemic to Brazil. Its natural habitat is rocky areas. It is threatened by habitat loss.
