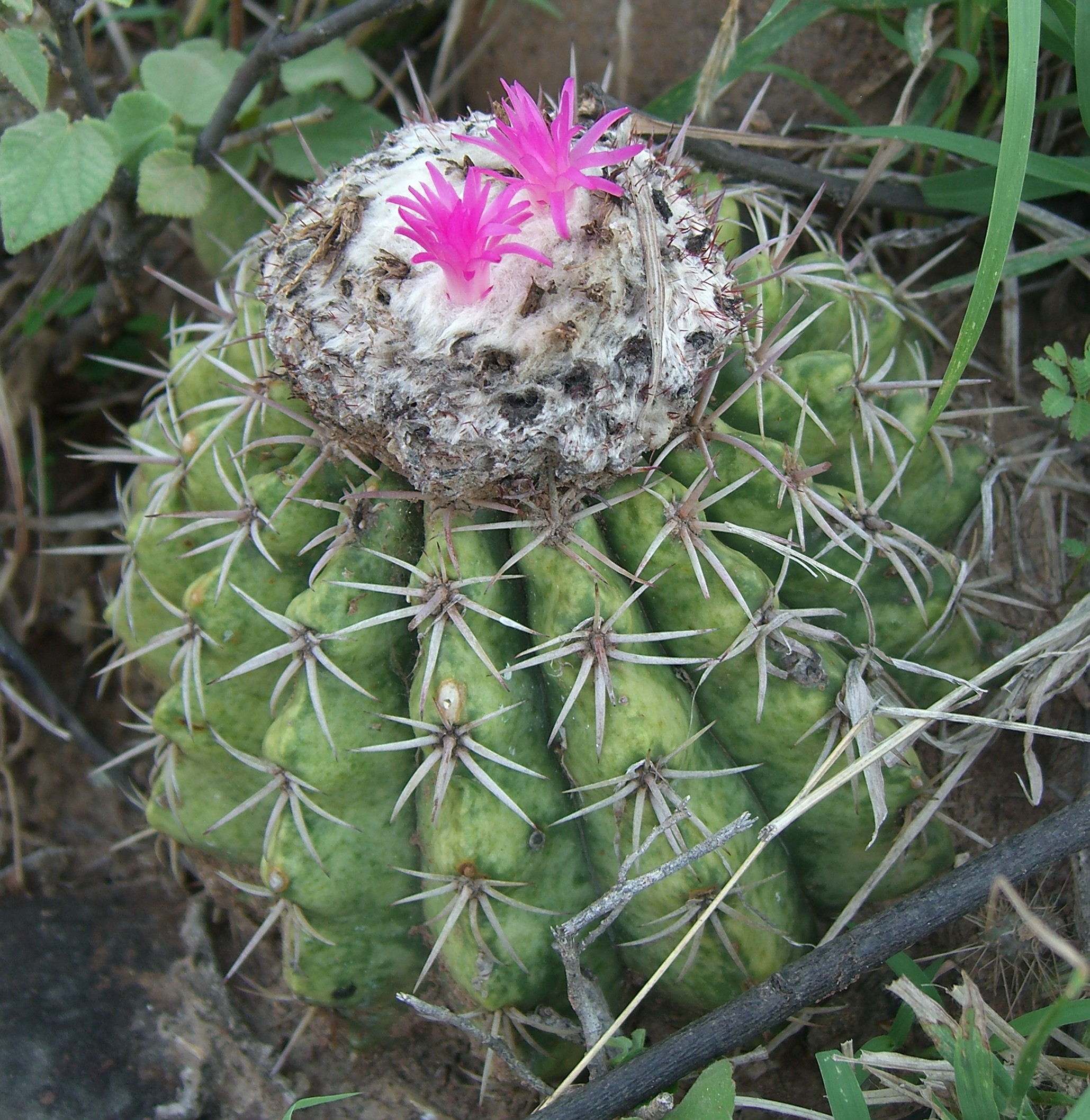

Scientific classification
- Kingdom: Plantae
- Clade: Tracheophytes
- Clade: Angiosperms
- Clade: Eudicots
- Order: Caryophyllales
- Family: Cactaceae
- Subfamily: Cactoideae
- Genus: Melocactus
- Species: M. curvispinus

Binomial name
- Melocactus curvispinus Pfeiff. 1837

Synonyms
- List: Of M. curvispinus subsp. caesius: Cactus caesius (H.L.Wendl.) Britton & Rose 1921; Melocactus caesius H.L.Wendl. 1841; Melocactus curvispinus f. caesius (H.L.Wendl.) N.P.Taylor 1991; Melocactus amoenus Hoffmanns. 1833; Melocactus curvispinus subsp. saravianus Fern.Alonso & Xhonneux 2002; Melocactus rubens Miq. 1841 Of M. curvispinus subsp. curvispinus: Cactus maxonii Rose 1907; Cactus oaxacensis Britton & Rose 1923; Cactus obtusipetalus (Lem.) Britton & Rose 1922; Cactus ruestii (K.Schum.) Britton & Rose 1922; Cactus salvador (L.Murillo) Britton & Rose 1922; Melocactus brongnartii Hildm. 1892; Melocactus crassicostatus Lem. 1838; Melocactus curvispinus subsp. cucutensis Xhonneux & Fern.Alonso 2002; Melocactus curvispinus subsp. loboguerreroi (Cárdenas) Fern.Alonso & Xhonneux 2002; Melocactus curvispinus subsp. obtusipetalus (Lem.) Xhonneux & Fern.Alonso 2002; Melocactus delessertianus Lem. ex Labour. 1853; Melocactus guatemalensis Gürke & Eichlam 1908; Melocactus humilis Suringar 1889; Melocactus loboguerreroi Cárdenas 1967; Melocactus maxonii (Rose) Gürke 1908; Melocactus maxonii var. sanctae-rosae L.D.Gómez 1977; Melocactus monvilleanus Miq. 1841; Melocactus oaxacensis (Britton & Rose) Backeb. 1960; Melocactus obtusipetalus Lem. 1838; Melocactus obtusipetalus var. crassicostatus (Lem.) Lem. ex Miq. 1841; Melocactus ruestii K.Schum. 1896; Melocactus ruestii subsp. centalapensis Elizondo 1986; Melocactus ruestii subsp. cintalapensis Elizondo 1986; Melocactus ruestii subsp. maxonii (Rose) Elizondo 1986; Melocactus ruestii subsp. oaxacensis (Britton & Rose) Elizondo 1986; Melocactus ruestii subsp. sanctae-rosae (L.D.Gómez) Elizondo 1986; Melocactus rustii K.Schum. 1896; Melocactus salvador L.Murillo 1897 Of M. curvispinus subsp. dawsonii: Melocactus dawsonii Bravo 1965 Of M. curvispinus subsp. guitartii: Melocactus guitartii León 1934 Of M. curvispinus subsp. koolwijkianus: Melocactus koolwijkianus Suringar 1885 publ. 1886; Melocactus appropinquatus Valck.Sur. 1901; Melocactus argenteus Suringar 1889; Melocactus argenteus var. tenuispina Suringar 1889; Melocactus armatus Suringar 1889; Melocactus compactus Suringar 1889; Melocactus koolwijkianus var. adustus Suringar 1889; Melocactus koolwijkianus f. plurispina Suringar 1889; Melocactus koolwijkianus f. quadrispina Suringar 1889; Melocactus martialis Suringar 1889; Melocactus nanus Suringar 1889; Melocactus radiatus Suringar 1889; Melocactus roseus Suringar 1889; Melocactus uncinatus Suringar 1889 Of M. curvispinus subsp. lobelii: Melocactus caesius subsp. lobelii (Suringar) Guiggi 2010; Melocactus curvispinus f. lobelii (Suringar) N.P.Taylor 1991; Melocactus lobelii Valck.Sur. 1896; Melocactus caesius var. griseus (H.L.Wendl. ex Miq.) C.F.Först. 1846; Melocactus cephalenoplus Lem. 1840; Melocactus griseus H.L.Wendl. ex Miq. 1841

= Melocactus curvispinus =

Species of cactus

Melocactus curvispinus is a species of Melocactus found from southern Mexico to Venezuela.

== Description ==
Melocactus curvispinus grows solitary with depressed, spherical to short-cylindrical, green to glauco-colored shoots measuring 6–30 cm high and 8–27 cm in diameter. It has 10-16 pointed ribs that may become warty, with sunken areoles in the notches. Some off-white to nearly black spines are curved; 1-4 central spines that are 15–52 mm, may be absent. There are 6–11, sometimes more radial spines thatare 3–42 mm long, with the lowest being the longest. From the small cephalium 3–4 cm high and 7–11 cm wide where reddish-brown bristles emerge. Flowers, which appear from the cephalium and extend over 10 mm above it, open in late afternoon. They are pink-violet, 18–43 mm long, and 10–25 mm wide. Fruits are club-shaped, pink to bright red or magenta, slightly lighter at the base.

=== Subspecies ===
Six subspecies are recognized:

Image	Name	Description	Distribution
	Melocactus curvispinus subsp. caesius (H.L.Wendl.) N.P.Taylor	as nearly erect or longer radial spines over 28 mm	Caribbean and coastal Colombia and Venezuela up to 700 m.
	Melocactus curvispinus subsp. curvispinus	Strongly backward-curved radial spines up to 28 mm	Mexico, Central America, Colombia, and western Venezuela up to 1,500 m elevation.
	Melocactus curvispinus subsp. dawsonii (Bravo) N.P.Taylor		Jalisco, Mexico.
	Melocactus curvispinus subsp. guitartii (León) Lodé		Cuba
	Melocactus curvispinus subsp. koolwijkianus (Suringar) G.Thomson		Aruba to Venezuela (Paraguaná Peninsula)
	Melocactus curvispinus subsp. lobelii (Suringar) Fern.Alonso & Xhonneux		NE. Colombia to N. Venezuela.

== Distribution ==
Distribution ranges from Mexico to southern Peru, northeastern Colombia, Venezuela, and the Caribbean.

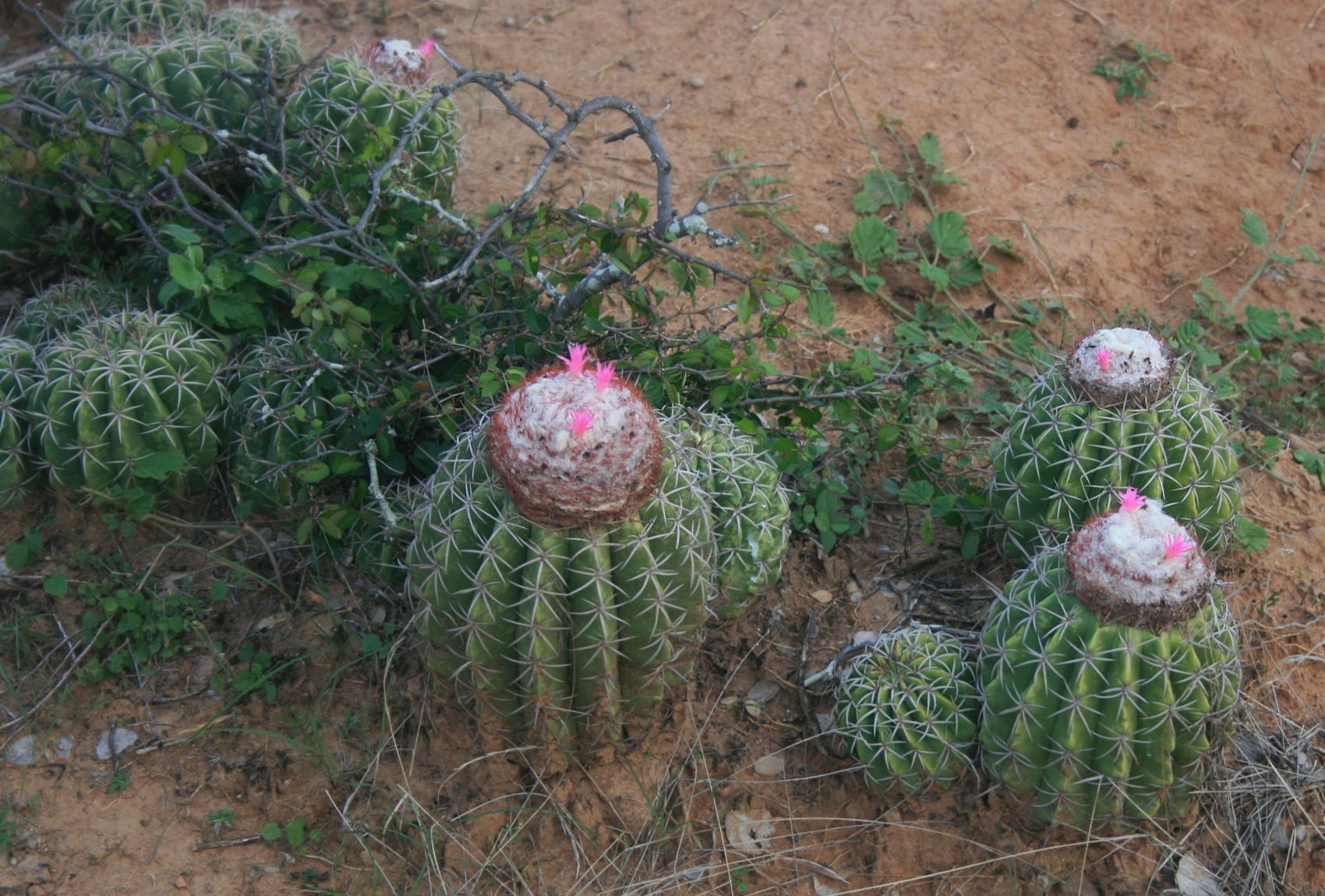
Habitat of Melocactus curvispinus subsp. curvispinus from Tatacoa Desert, Huila, Colombia

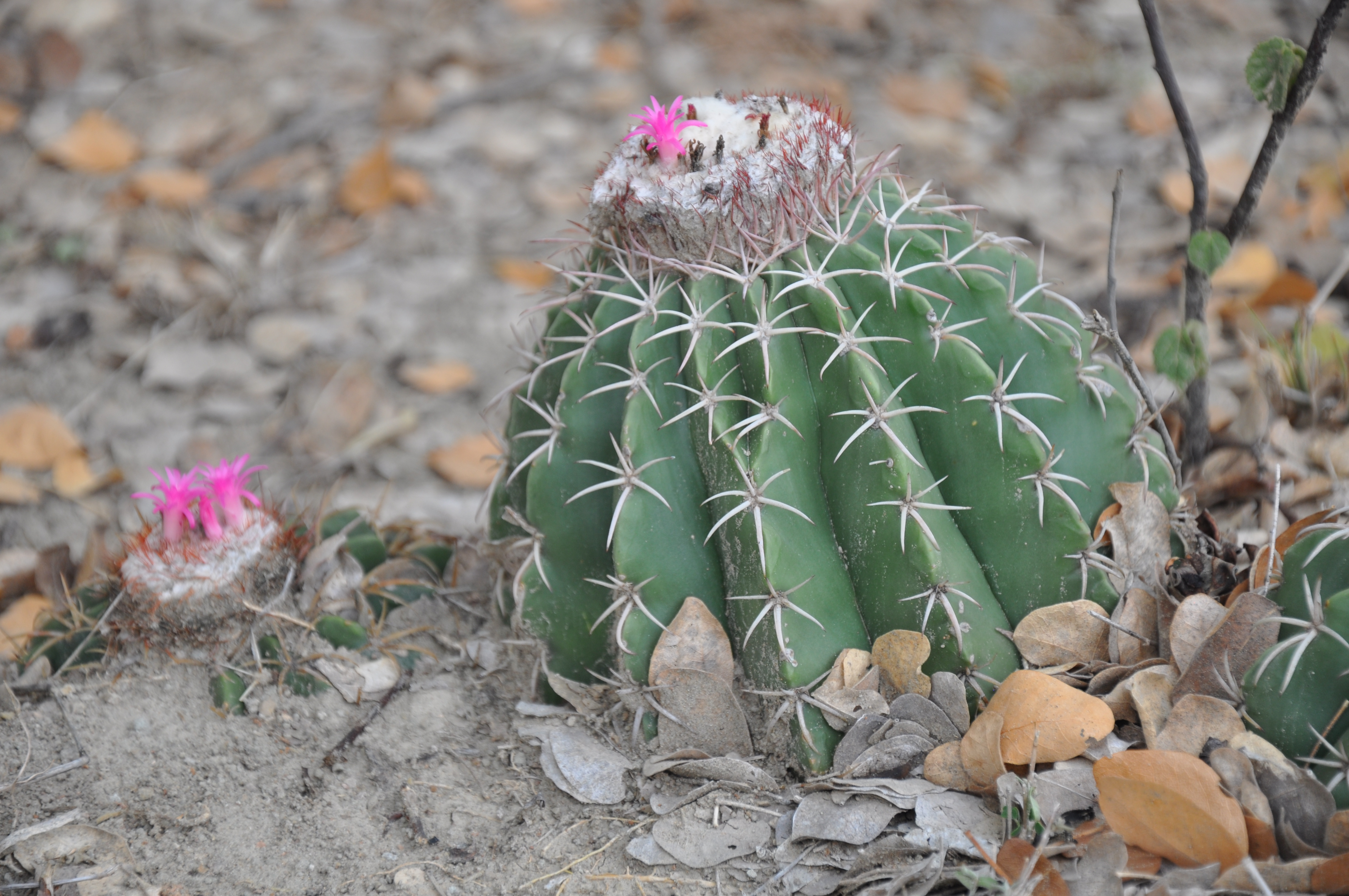
Habitat of Melocactus curvispinus subsp. curvispinus from Tatacoa Desert, Huila, Colombia

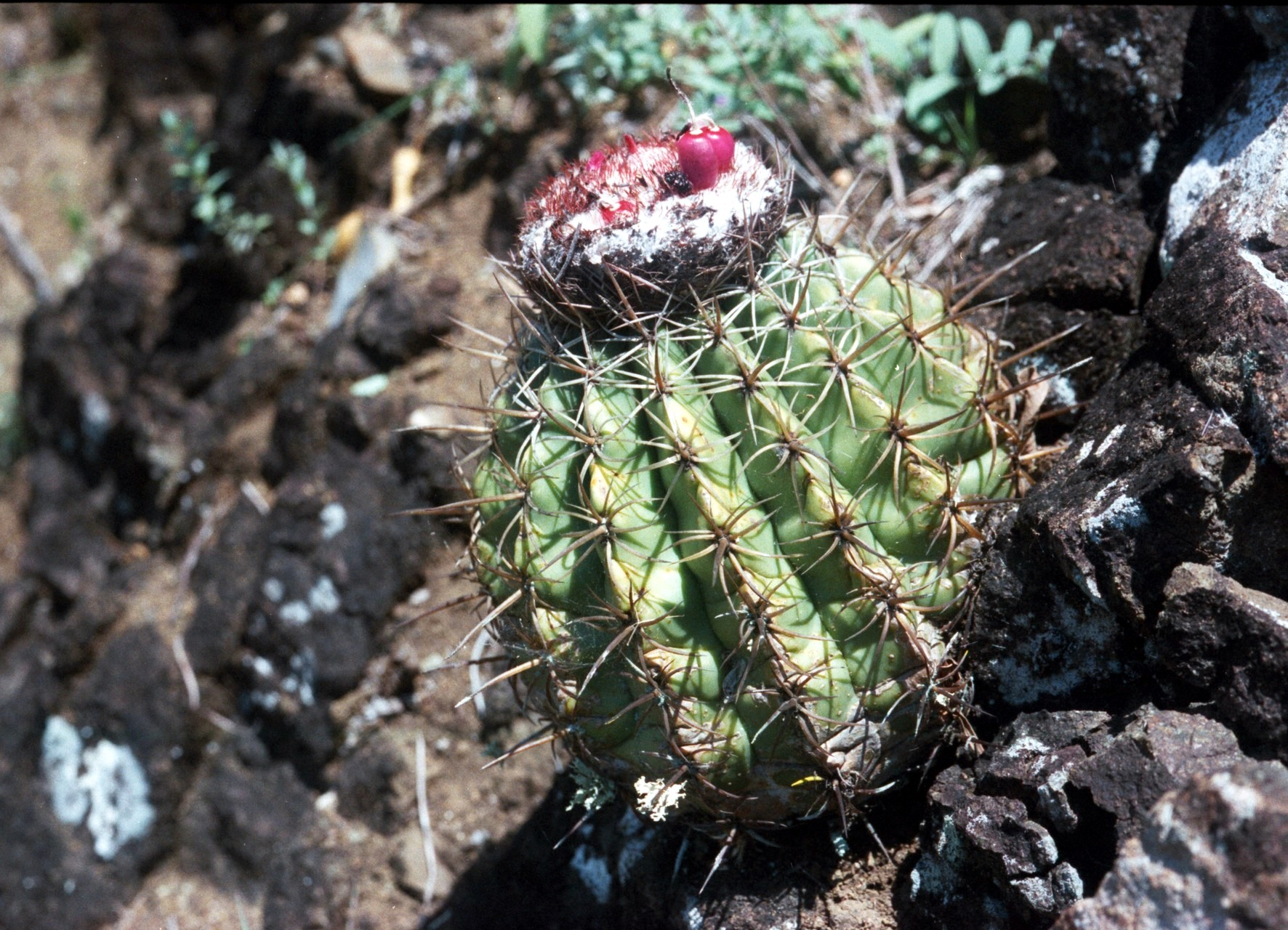
Melocactus curvispinus subsp. curvispinus growing in Loboguerrero, Colombia

== Taxonomy ==
The plants was first described in 1837 by Ludwig Pfeiffer.
