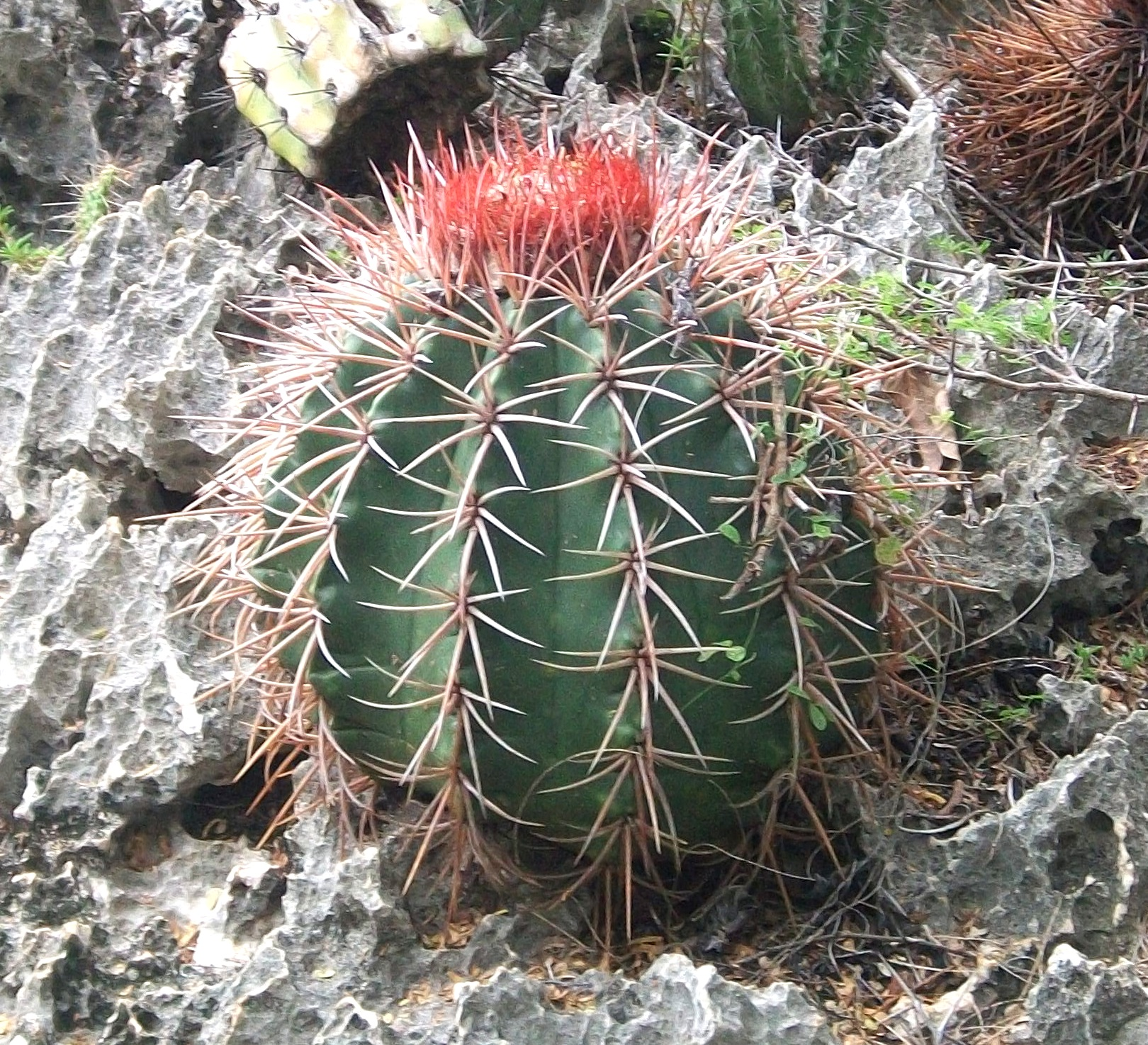

Conservation status
- Near Threatened (IUCN 3.1)

Scientific classification
- Kingdom: Plantae
- Clade: Tracheophytes
- Clade: Angiosperms
- Clade: Eudicots
- Order: Caryophyllales
- Family: Cactaceae
- Subfamily: Cactoideae
- Genus: Melocactus
- Species: M. caroli-linnaei

Binomial name
- Melocactus caroli-linnaei N.P.Taylor

= Melocactus caroli-linnaei =

Species of cactus

Melocactus caroli-linnaei is a cactus (a member of the family Cactaceae) found in Jamaica. When mature it is columnar, up to 1 m (3.3 ft) high. Like all species of Melocactus, it forms a "cephalium" when mature – a dense mass of areoles covered with wool and spines at the tip of the stem. Flowers are produced only from the cephalium.

== Description ==
Melocactus caroli-linnaei grows with cylindrical green stems and reaches a size of up to 1 meter in height. The stem has ten to fifteen ribs or folds with areoles of ten to twelve spines each (sometimes more). The strong 3-5 centimeter, ten to twelve long spines are brownish-yellow in color. The very dense, long and strong bristles of cephalus hide their wool. The flowers are narrow, red and up to 4 centimeters long. The red, club-shaped fruits reach a length of up to 5 centimeters.

== Description ==
Melocactus caroli-linnaei is widespread in Jamaica.

== Taxonomy ==
The species was originally named Cactus melocactus by Carl Linnaeus in 1753 in Species Plantarum. The genus Cactus was later split and the pre-Linnaean name Melocactus was used for melocacti. The rules of botanical nomenclature forbid the repetition of a genus name and a specific epithet, so the name "Melocactus melocactus" is not allowed. In 1991, Nigel Taylor gave the species its current name, Melocactus caroli-linnaei.

In 1922, Nathaniel Lord Britton and Joseph Nelson Rose, in their work The Cactaceae, restricted the use of the name Cactus melocactus back to the Jamaican species only.
