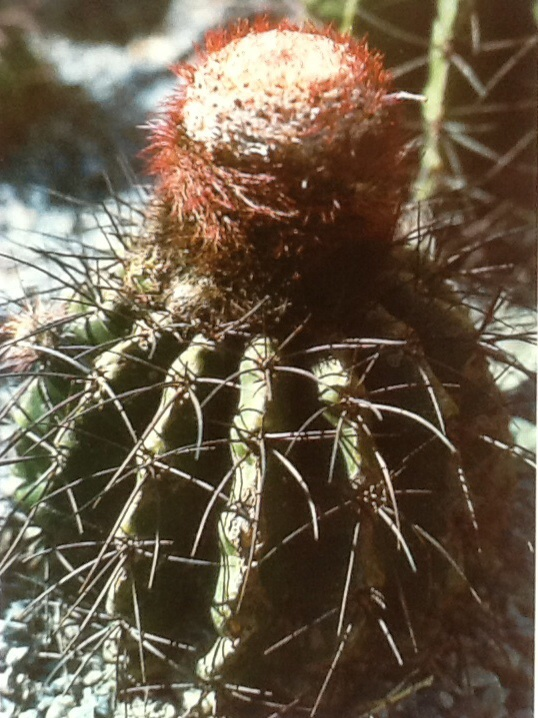

Conservation status
- Data Deficient (IUCN 3.1)

Scientific classification
- Kingdom: Plantae
- Clade: Tracheophytes
- Clade: Angiosperms
- Clade: Eudicots
- Order: Caryophyllales
- Family: Cactaceae
- Subfamily: Cactoideae
- Genus: Melocactus
- Species: M. estevesii

Binomial name
- Melocactus estevesii P.J.Braun

= Melocactus estevesii =

Species of cactus

Melocactus estevesii is a species of Melocactus found in Brazil.
