= Friedrich Karl Johann Vaupel =

German botanist (1876–1927)

Friedrich Karl Johann Vaupel ( 23 May 1876, Kreuznach – 4 May 1927, Berlin) was a German botanist who specialized in the study of cacti. He was the binomial authority of many species within the family Cactaceae.

He studied medicine and natural sciences in Berlin, Heidelberg and Munich, obtaining his PhD in 1903 as a student of Karl Ritter von Goebel at Munich. While still a student, he participated in a scientific journey to Mexico and the West Indies (1899–1900). Following graduation, from 1903 to 1907, he was involved in an extended expedition to India, Australia and Samoa.

In 1908 he began work as an assistant at the botanical museum in Berlin-Dahlem, where in 1921 he became a curator. In 1926 he was awarded with the title of professor. The genus Vaupelia was named in his honor by botanist August Brand (1863–1930).

== Published works ==
He was an editor of the multi-volume "Blühende Kakteen (Iconographia cactacearum)", issued in 45 parts from 1900 to 1921. The project was originated by Karl Moritz Schumann in 1900, and continued by Max Gürke and Vaupel. Other written efforts by Vaupel include:

- Vier von Ule in Nordbrasilien und Peru gesammelte Kakteen, (1913).
- Zeitschrift für Sukkulentenkunde, (editor).
- Die Kakteen: Monographie der Cactaceae, (1925, 1926).
