= List of species protected by CITES Appendix I =

This is a list of species of plants and animals protected by Appendix I of the Convention on International Trade in Endangered Species of Wild Fauna and Flora, commonly abbreviated as CITES. There are no fungi listed in any appendix.

- List of species protected by CITES Appendix II
- List of species protected by CITES Appendix III

== Appendix I ==
- Abies guatemalensis
- Abronia anzuetoi
- Abronia campbelli
- Abronia fimbriata
- Abronia frosti
- Abronia meledona
- Acerodon jubatus
- Aceros nipalensis
- Achatinella spp.
- Achillides chikae chikae – Remains listed in Appendix I under this name, but now classified as Papilio chikae
- Achillides chikae hermeli – Remains listed in Appendix I under this name, but now classified as Papilio chikae
- Acinonyx jubatus (Annual export quotas for hunting trophies and live specimens granted as follows: Botswana: 5; Namibia: 150; Zimbabwe: 50)
- Acipenser brevirostrum
- Acipenser sturio
- Acrantophis spp.
- Addax nasomaculatus
- Aerangis ellisii
- Agave parviflora
- Ailuropoda melanoleuca
- Ailurus fulgens
- Alligator sinensis
- Aloe albida
- Aloe albiflora
- Aloe alfredii
- Aloe bakeri
- Aloe bellatula
- Aloe calcairophila
- Aloe compressa (Includes vars. paucituberculata, rugosquamosa and schistophila)
- Aloe delphinensis
- Aloe descoingsii
- Aloe fragilis
- Aloe haworthioides (Includes Aloe haworthioides var. aurantiaca)
- Aloe helenae
- Aloe laeta (Includes Aloe laeta var. maniaensis)
- Aloe parallelifolia
- Aloe parvula
- Aloe pillansii
- Aloe polyphylla
- Aloe rauhii
- Aloe suzannae
- Aloe versicolor
- Aloe vossii
- Alouatta coibensis
- Alouatta palliata
- Alouatta pigra
- Altiphrynoides spp.
- Amazona arausiaca
- Amazona auropalliata
- Amazona barbadensis
- Amazona brasiliensis
- Amazona finschi
- Amazona guildingii
- Amazona imperialis
- Amazona leucocephala
- Amazona oratrix
- Amazona pretrei
- Amazona rhodocorytha
- Amazona tucumana
- Amazona versicolor
- Amazona vinacea
- Amazona viridigenalis
- Amazona vittata
- Amietophrynus channingi
- Amietophrynus superciliaris
- Anas aucklandica
- Anas chlorotis
- Anas laysanensis
- Anas nesiotis
- Andrias spp.
- Anodorhynchus spp.
- Antigone canadensis nesiotes
- Antigone canadensis pulla
- Antigone vipio
- Antilocapra americana (Only the population of Mexico; other populations are not included in the Appendices)
- Aonyx capensis microdon (Only the populations of Cameroon and Nigeria; all other populations are included in Appendix II)
- Aonyx cinereus
- Apalone spinifera atra
- Aquila adalberti
- Aquila heliaca
- Ara ambiguus
- Ara glaucogularis
- Ara macao
- Ara militaris
- Ara rubrogenys
- Araucaria araucana
- Arctocephalus townsendi
- Ardeotis nigriceps
- Ariocarpus spp.
- Asarcornis scutulata
- Astrochelys radiata
- Astrochelys yniphora
- Astrophytum asterias
- Ateles geoffroyi frontatus
- Ateles geoffroyi ornatus
- Atelopus zeteki
- Atrichornis clamosus
- Axis calamianensis
- Axis kuhlii
- Axis porcinus annamiticus
- Aztekium ritteri
- Babyrousa babyrussa
- Babyrousa bolabatuensis
- Babyrousa celebensis
- Babyrousa togeanensis
- Balaena mysticetus
- Balaenoptera acutorostrata (Except the population of West Greenland, which is included in Appendix II)
- Balaenoptera bonaerensis
- Balaenoptera borealis
- Balaenoptera edeni
- Balaenoptera musculus
- Balaenoptera omurai
- Balaenoptera physalus
- Balearica pavonina
- Balmea stormiae
- Batagur affinis
- Batagur baska
- Berardius spp.
- Bettongia spp.
- Blastocerus dichotomus
- Boa constrictor occidentalis
- Bolyeria multocarinata
- Bos gaurus (Excludes the domesticated form Bos frontalis)
- Bos mutus (Excludes the domesticated form Bos grunniens)
- Bos sauveli
- Brachylophus spp.
- Brachyteles arachnoides
- Brachyteles hypoxanthus
- Branta sandvicensis
- Brookesia perarmata
- Bubalus depressicornis
- Bubalus mindorensis
- Bubalus quarlesi
- Buceros bicornis
- Cacajao spp.
- Cacatua goffiniana
- Cacatua haematuropygia
- Cacatua moluccensis
- Cacatua sulphurea
- Caiman crocodilus apaporiensis
- Caiman latirostris (Except the population of Argentina, which is included in Appendix II)
- Callimico goeldii
- Callithrix aurita
- Callithrix flaviceps
- Caloenas nicobarica
- Camelus ferus (Excludes the domesticated form Camelus bactrianus)
- Canis lupus (Only the populations of Bhutan, India, Nepal and Pakistan; all other populations are included in Appendix II. Excludes the domesticated form, Canis lupus familiaris, and the dingo, Canis lupus dingo
- Caperea marginata
- Capra falconeri
- Capricornis milneedwardsii
- Capricornis rubidus
- Capricornis sumatraensis
- Capricornis thar
- Caprolagus hispidus
- Caracal caracal (Only the population of Asia; all other populations are included in Appendix II)
- Carduelis cucullata
- Casarea dussumieri
- Catagonus wagneri
- Catopuma temminckii
- Catreus wallichii
- Cephalophus jentinki
- Ceratozamia spp.
- Cercocebus galeritus
- Cercopithecus diana
- Cercopithecus roloway
- Cervus elaphus hanglu – Remains listed in Appendix I under this name, but now classified as C. hanglu hanglu
- Chasmistes cujus
- Cheirogaleidae spp.
- Cheloniidae spp.
- Chelonoidis niger
- Chinchilla spp. (Specimens of the domesticated form are not subject to the provisions of the Convention)
- Chiropotes albinasus
- Chitra chitra
- Chitra vandijki
- Chlamydotis macqueenii
- Chlamydotis undulata
- Chondrohierax wilsonii
- Ciconia boyciana
- Cnemaspis psychedelica
- Colinus virginianus ridgwayi
- Conradilla caelata
- Coryphantha werdermannii
- Cotinga maculata
- Crax blumenbachii
- Crocodylus acutus (Except the population of the Integrated Management District of Mangroves of the Bay of Cispata, Tinajones, La Balsa and surrounding areas, Córdoba Department, and the population of Cuba, which are included in Appendix II)
- Crocodylus cataphractus – now reclassified as the genus Mecistops, with two species; remains in Appendix I as C. cataphractus
- Crocodylus intermedius
- Crocodylus mindorensis
- Crocodylus moreletii (Except the population of Belize, which is included in Appendix II with a zero quota for wild specimens traded for commercial purposes, and the population of Mexico, which is included in Appendix II)
- Crocodylus niloticus (Except the populations of Botswana, Egypt (subject to a zero quota for wild specimens traded for commercial purposes), Ethiopia, Kenya, Madagascar, Malawi, Mozambique, Namibia, South Africa, Uganda, the Tanzania (subject to an annual export quota of no more than 1,600 wild specimens including hunting trophies, in addition to ranched specimens), Zambia and Zimbabwe, which are included in Appendix II)
- Crocodylus palustris
- Crocodylus porosus (Except the populations of Australia, Indonesia, Malaysia (wild harvest restricted to the Sarawak and a zero quota for wild specimens for the other States of Malaysia (Sabah and Peninsular Malaysia), with no change in the zero quota unless approved by the Parties) and Papua New Guinea, which are included in Appendix II)
- Crocodylus rhombifer
- Crocodylus siamensis
- Crossoptilon crossoptilon
- Crossoptilon mantchuricum
- Cyanopsitta spixii
- Cyanoramphus cookii
- Cyanoramphus forbesi
- Cyanoramphus novaezelandiae
- Cyanoramphus saisseti
- Cycas beddomei
- Cyclopsitta diophthalma coxeni
- Cyclura spp.
- Cynomys mexicanus
- Dalbergia nigra
- Dama dama mesopotamica – Remains listed in Appendix I under this name, but now classified as D. mesopotamica
- Dasyornis broadbenti litoralis – now considered extinct
- Dasyornis longirostris
- Daubentonia madagascariensis
- Dendrobium cruentum
- Dermochelys coriacea
- Discocactus spp.
- Dromus dromas
- Dryocopus javensis richardsi
- Ducula mindorensis
- Dugong dugon
- Dypsis decipiens
- Echinocereus ferreirianus ssp. lindsayi
- Echinocereus schmollii
- Elephas maximus
- Encephalartos spp.
- Enhydra lutris nereis
- Eos histrio
- Epicrates inornatus
- Epicrates monensis
- Epicrates subflavus
- Epioblasma curtisi
- Epioblasma florentina
- Epioblasma sampsonii
- Epioblasma sulcata perobliqua
- Epioblasma torulosa gubernaculum
- Epioblasma torulosa torulosa
- Epioblasma turgidula
- Epioblasma walkeri
- Equus africanus (Excludes the domesticated form Equus asinus)
- Equus grevyi
- Equus hemionus hemionus
- Equus hemionus khur
- Equus przewalskii
- Eschrichtius robustus
- Escobaria minima
- Escobaria sneedii
- Eubalaena spp.
- Eunymphicus cornutus
- Euphorbia ambovombensis
- Euphorbia cap-saintemariensis
- Euphorbia cremersii (Includes the forma viridifolia and the var. rakotozafyi)
- Euphorbia cylindrifolia (Includes Euphorbia cylindrifolia ssp. tuberifera)
- Euphorbia decaryi (Includes the vars. ampanihyensis, robinsonii and spirosticha)
- Euphorbia francoisii
- Euphorbia moratii (Includes the vars. antsingiensis, bemarahensis and multiflora)
- Euphorbia parvicyathophora
- Euphorbia quartziticola
- Euphorbia tulearensis
- Falco araeus
- Falco jugger
- Falco newtoni (Only the population of Seychelles; all other populations are included in Appendix II)
- Falco peregrinus
- Falco punctatus
- Falco rusticolus
- Felis nigripes
- Fitzroya cupressoides
- Fouquieria fasciculata
- Fouquieria purpusii
- Fregata andrewsi
- Fusconaia cuneolus
- Fusconaia edgariana
- Gallotia simonyi
- Gavialis gangeticus
- Gazella cuvieri
- Gazella leptoceros
- Geochelone platynota
- Geoclemys hamiltonii
- Geronticus eremita
- Glaucis dohrnii
- Glyptemys muhlenbergii
- Gopherus flavomarginatus
- Gorilla beringei
- Gorilla gorilla
- Grus americana
- Grus japonensis
- Grus monacha
- Grus nigricollis
- Guarouba guarouba
- Gymnogyps californianus
- Haliaeetus albicilla
- Harpia harpyja
- Helarctos malayanus
- Heloderma horridum charlesbogerti – Remains in Appendix I under this name, but now classified as H. charlesbogerti
- Herpailurus yagouaroundi (Only the populations of Central and North America; all other populations are included in Appendix II)
- Heteroglaux blewitti
- Hippocamelus spp.
- Hippotragus niger variani
- Houbaropsis bengalensis
- Hylobatidae spp.
- Hyperoodon spp.
- Hypotaenidia sylvestris
- Incilius periglenes
- Indriidae spp.
- Jabiru mycteria
- Laelia jongheana
- Laelia lobata
- Lagorchestes hirsutus
- Lagostrophus fasciatus
- Lampsilis higginsii
- Lampsilis orbiculata orbiculata
- Lampsilis satur
- Lampsilis virescens
- Larus relictus
- Lasiorhinus krefftii
- Latimeria spp.
- Lemuridae spp.
- Leontopithecus spp.
- Leopardus geoffroyi
- Leopardus guttulus
- Leopardus jacobita
- Leopardus pardalis
- Leopardus tigrinus
- Leopardus wiedii
- Lepilemuridae spp.
- Leporillus conditor
- Leucogeranus leucogeranus
- Leucopsar rothschildi
- Lipotes vexillifer – possibly extinct
- Lontra felina
- Lontra longicaudis
- Lontra provocax
- Lophophorus impejanus
- Lophophorus lhuysii
- Lophophorus sclateri
- Lophura edwardsi
- Lophura swinhoii
- Loxodonta africana (Except the populations of Botswana, Namibia, South Africa and Zimbabwe, which are included in Appendix II subject to annotation 2) – L. africana now refers exclusively to the African bush elephant; the African forest elephant, which remains listed in Appendix I as part of L. africana, is now classified as L. cyclotis
- Lutra lutra
- Lutra nippon
- Lutrogale perspicillata
- Lygodactylus williamsi
- Lynx pardinus
- Macaca silenus
- Macaca sylvanus
- Macrocephalon maleo
- Macrotis lagotis
- Mammillaria pectinifera (includes Mammillaria pectinifera ssp. solisioides)
- Mandrillus leucophaeus
- Mandrillus sphinx
- Manis crassicaudata
- Manis culionensis
- Manis gigantea
- Manis javanica
- Manis pentadactyla
- Manis temminckii
- Manis tetradactyla
- Manis tricuspis
- Megaptera novaeangliae
- Melanochelys tricarinata
- Melanosuchus niger (Except the population of Brazil, which is included in Appendix II, and the population of Ecuador, which is included in Appendix II and is subject to a zero annual export quota until an annual export quota has been approved by the CITES Secretariat and the IUCN/SSC Crocodile Specialist Group)
- Melocactus conoideus
- Melocactus deinacanthus
- Melocactus glaucescens
- Melocactus paucispinus
- Melursus ursinus
- Microcycas calocoma
- Mimizuku gurneyi
- Mitu mitu
- Monachus spp.
- Morenia ocellata
- Moschus spp. (Only the populations of Afghanistan, Bhutan, India, Myanmar, Nepal and Pakistan; all other populations are included in Appendix II)
- Muntiacus crinifrons
- Muntiacus vuquangensis
- Mustela nigripes
- Mycteria cinerea
- Naemorhedus baileyi
- Naemorhedus caudatus
- Naemorhedus goral
- Naemorhedus griseus
- Nanger dama
- Nasalis larvatus
- Nectophrynoides spp.
- Neofelis diardi
- Neofelis nebulosa
- Neophema chrysogaster
- Neophocaena asiaeorientalis
- Neophocaena phocaenoides
- Nepenthes khasiana
- Nepenthes rajah
- Neurergus kaiseri
- Nilssonia gangetica
- Nilssonia hurum
- Nilssonia nigricans
- Nimbaphrynoides spp.
- Ninox natalis
- Nipponia nippon
- Numenius borealis – possibly extinct
- Numenius tenuirostris – declared extinct in 2024, but still protected
- Nycticebus spp.
- Obregonia denegrii
- Ognorhynchus icterotis
- Onychogalea fraenata
- Orcaella brevirostris
- Orcaella heinsohni
- Oreonax flavicauda
- Oreophasis derbianus
- Ornithoptera alexandrae
- Oryx dammah
- Oryx leucoryx
- Osteolaemus tetraspis
- Ovis gmelini (only the population of Cyprus; no other population is included in the Appendices]])
- Ovis hodgsonii
- Ovis nigrimontana
- Ovis vignei
- Ozotoceros bezoarticus
- Pachycereus militaris
- Pachypodium ambongense
- Pachypodium baronii
- Pachypodium decaryi
- Pangasianodon gigas
- Pangshura tecta
- Pan spp.
- Panthera leo (only the populations of India; all other populations are included in Appendix II)
- Panthera onca
- Panthera pardus
- Panthera tigris
- Panthera uncia
- Pantholops hodgsonii
- Papasula abbotti
- Paphiopedilum spp.
- Papilio chikae
- Papilio homerus
- Pardofelis marmorata
- Pediocactus bradyi
- Pediocactus knowltonii
- Pediocactus paradinei
- Pediocactus peeblesianus
- Pediocactus sileri
- Pelecanus crispus
- Pelecyphora spp.
- Penelope albipennis
- Perameles bougainville
- Peristeria elata
- Pezoporus flavivensis – Remains protected by Appendix I under this name, but now classified as P. wallicus flavivensis
- Pezoporus occidentalis
- Pezoporus wallicus
- Pharomachrus mocinno
- Phocoena sinus
- Phoebastria albatrus
- Phragmipedium spp.
- Physeter macrocephalus
- Picathartes gymnocephalus
- Picathartes oreas
- Pilgerodendron uviferum
- Piliocolobus kirkii
- Piliocolobus rufomitratus
- Pionopsitta pileata
- Pipile jacutinga
- Pipile pipile
- Pithecophaga jefferyi
- Pitta gurneyi
- Pitta kochi
- Platanista spp.
- Platysternidae spp.
- Plethobasus cicatricosus
- Plethobasus cooperianus
- Pleurobema plenum
- Pionopsitta pileata
- Podilymbus gigas – declared extinct around 1990, but remains protected
- Podocarpus parlatorei
- Polymita spp.
- Polyplectron napoleonis
- Pongo abelii
- Pongo pygmaeus
- Pongo tapanuliensis
- Potamilus capax
- Presbytis potenziani
- Primolius couloni
- Primolius maracana
- Priodontes maximus
- Prionailurus bengalensis bengalensis (Only the populations of Bangladesh, India and Thailand; all other populations are included in Appendix II)
- Prionailurus planiceps
- Prionailurus rubiginosus (Only the population of India; all other populations are included in Appendix II)
- Prionodon pardicolor
- Pristidae spp.
- Probarbus jullieni
- Probosciger aterrimus
- Psammobates geometricus
- Psephotellus chrysopterygius
- Psephotellus dissimilis
- Psephotellus pulcherrimus – considered to have been extinct since 1927, but remains protected
- Pseudemydura umbrina
- Pseudochelidon sirintarae
- Pseudomys fieldi praeconis
- Pseudoryx nghetinhensis
- Psittacula echo
- Psittacus erithacus
- Pterocnemia pennata (Except Pterocnemia pennata pennata which is included in Appendix II)
- Pteronura brasiliensis
- Pteropus insularis – Remains listed in Appendix I under this name, but now classified as P. pelagicus
- Pteropus loochoensis
- Pteropus mariannus
- Pteropus molossinus
- Pteropus pelewensis
- Pteropus pilosus
- Pteropus samoensis
- Pteropus tonganus
- Pteropus ualanus
- Pteropus yapensis – Remains listed in Appendix I under this name; considered by some authorities to be a subspecies of P. pelewensis
- Pudu puda
- Puma concolor (only the populations of Costa Rica and Panama; all other populations are included in Appendix II)
- Pycnonotus zeylanicus
- Pygathrix spp.
- Pyrrhura cruentata
- Python molurus molurus
- Pyxis arachnoides
- Pyxis planicauda
- Quadrula intermedia
- Quadrula sparsa
- Renanthera imschootiana
- Rheinardia ocellata
- Rhinocerotidae spp. (Except the subspecies included in Appendix II)
- Rhinopithecus spp.
- Rhinoplax vigil
- Rhodonessa caryophyllacea
- Rhynchopsitta spp.
- Rhynochetos jubatus
- Rhyticeros subruficollis
- Romerolagus diazi
- Rucervus duvaucelii
- Rucervus eldii
- Saguinus bicolor
- Saguinus geoffroyi
- Saguinus leucopus
- Saguinus martinsi
- Saguinus oedipus
- Saimiri oerstedii
- Sanzinia madagascariensis
- Sarracenia oreophila
- Sarracenia rubra ssp. alabamensis
- Sarracenia rubra ssp. jonesii
- Sauromalus varius
- Saussurea costus
- Sclerocactus blainei
- Sclerocactus brevihamatus ssp. tobuschii
- Sclerocactus brevispinus
- Sclerocactus cloverae
- Sclerocactus erectocentrus
- Sclerocactus glaucus
- Sclerocactus mariposensis
- Sclerocactus mesae-verdae
- Sclerocactus nyensis
- Sclerocactus papyracanthus
- Sclerocactus pubispinus
- Sclerocactus sileri
- Sclerocactus wetlandicus
- Sclerocactus wrightiae
- Scleropages formosus
- Scleropages inscriptus
- Semnopithecus ajax
- Semnopithecus dussumieri
- Semnopithecus entellus
- Semnopithecus hector
- Semnopithecus hypoleucos
- Semnopithecus priam
- Semnopithecus schistaceus
- Shinisaurus crocodilurus
- Simias concolor
- Sminthopsis longicaudata
- Sminthopsis psammophila
- Sotalia spp.
- Sousa spp.
- Speothos venaticus
- Spheniscus humboldti
- Sphenodon spp.
- Stangeria eriopus
- Strigops habroptilus
- Strombocactus spp.
- Struthio camelus (Only the populations of Algeria, Burkina Faso, Cameroon, the Central African Republic, Chad, Mali, Mauritania, Morocco, Niger, Nigeria, Senegal and Sudan, roughly corresponding to the range of S. c. camelus; all other populations are not included in the Appendices)
- Sus salvanius
- Syrmaticus ellioti
- Syrmaticus humiae
- Syrmaticus mikado
- Tapiridae spp. (Except the species included in Appendix II)
- Telmatobius culeus
- Terrapene coahuila
- Testudo kleinmanni
- Tetraogallus caspius
- Tetraogallus tibetanus
- Tinamus solitarius
- Tomistoma schlegelii
- Totoaba macdonaldi
- Toxolasma cylindrellus
- Trachypithecus geei
- Trachypithecus pileatus
- Trachypithecus shortridgei
- Tragopan blythii
- Tragopan caboti
- Tragopan melanocephalus
- Tremarctos ornatus
- Trichechus inunguis
- Trichechus manatus
- Trichechus senegalensis
- Tringa guttifer
- Turbinicarpus spp.
- Tyto soumagnei
- Uebelmannia spp.
- Unio nickliniana
- Unio tampicoensis tecomatensis
- Ursus arctos (Only the populations of Bhutan, China, Mexico, and Mongolia; all other populations are included in Appendix II)
- Ursus arctos isabellinus
- Ursus thibetanus
- Varanus bengalensis
- Varanus flavescens
- Varanus griseus
- Varanus komodoensis
- Varanus nebulosus
- Vicugna vicugna Except the populations of: Argentina (the populations of the Provinces of Jujuy and Catamarca and the semi-captive populations of the Provinces of Jujuy, Salta, Catamarca, La Rioja and San Juan), Chile (population of the Primera Región), Ecuador (the whole population), Peru (the whole population) and Bolivia (the whole population), which are included in Appendix II) – now classified as Lama vicugna, but remains protected as shown here
- Villosa trabalis
- Vini ultramarina
- Vipera ursinii (Only the population of Europe except the area which formerly constituted the Union of Soviet Socialist Republics; these latter populations are not included in the Appendices)
- Vultur gryphus
- Xanthopsar flavus
- Xeromys myoides
- Xipholena atropurpurea
- Zamia restrepoi
- Zosterops albogularis
- Zyzomys pedunculatus
