= List of species protected by CITES Appendix II =

This is a list of species of plants and animals protected by Appendix II of the Convention on International Trade in Endangered Species of Wild Fauna and Flora, commonly abbreviated as CITES. There are no fungi listed in any appendix.

- List of species protected by CITES Appendix I
- List of species protected by CITES Appendix III

== Appendix II ==
- Abronia spp. [except the species included in Appendix I (zero export quota for wild specimens for Abronia aurita, Abronia gaiophantasma, Abronia montecristoi, Abronia salvadorensis and Abronia vasconcelosii)
- Acerodon spp. (Except the species included in Appendix I)
- Aceros spp. (Except the species included in Appendix I)
- Acipenseriformes spp. (Except the species included in Appendix I)
- Adansonia grandidieri
- Adelphobates spp.
- Adenia firingalavensis
- Adenia olaboensis
- Adenia subsessilifolia
- Adonis vernalis
- Agalychnis spp.
- Agave victoriae-reginae
- Allobates femoralis
- Allobates hodli
- Allobates myersi
- Allobates zaparo
- Aloe spp. (Except the species included in Appendix I. Also excludes Aloe vera, also referenced as Aloe barbadensis which is not included in the Appendices)
- Alopias spp. (entry into effect delayed until 4 October 2017)
- Amandava formosa
- Amblyrhynchus cristatus
- Ambystoma dumerilii
- Ambystoma mexicanum
- Ameerega spp.
- Ammotragus lervia
- Amyda cartilaginea
- Anacampseros spp.
- Anas bernieri
- Anas formosa
- Andinobates spp.
- Anguilla anguilla
- Aniba rosaeodora
- Anomaloglossus rufulus
- Anorrhinus spp.
- Anthracoceros spp.
- Antipatharia spp. "Black corals"
- Aphonopelma albiceps – Remains listed in Appendix II under this name, but now classified as Brachypelma albiceps
- Aphonopelma pallidum
- Aquilaria spp.
- Arapaima gigas
- Archaius spp.
- Arctocephalus spp. (Except the species included in Appendix I)
- Argusianus argus
- Atheris desaixi
- Atrophaneura jophon – Remains listed in Appendix II under this name, but now classified as Pachliopta jophon
- Atrophaneura pandiyana – Remains listed in Appendix II under this name, but now classified as Pachliopta pandiyana
- Avonia spp. – Remain listed in Appendix II under this name, but now classified within Anacampseros, also listed in Appendix II
- Balaeniceps rex
- Batagur borneoensis (Zero quota for wild specimens for commercial purposes)
- Batagur dhongoka
- Batagur kachuga
- Batagur trivittata (Zero quota for wild specimens for commercial purposes)
- Beaucarnea spp.
- Beccariophoenix madagascariensis
- Berenicornis spp.
- Bhutanitis spp.
- Bitis worthingtoni
- Boidae spp. (Except the species included in Appendix I)
- Bolyeriidae spp. (Except the species included in Appendix I)
- Bowenia spp.
- Brachypelma spp.
- Bradypodion spp.
- Bradypus pygmaeus
- Bradypus variegatus
- Branta canadensis leucopareia
- Branta ruficollis
- Brookesia spp. (Except the species included in Appendix I)
- Buceros spp. (Except the species included in Appendix I)
- Budorcas taxicolor
- Bulnesia sarmientoi
- Cactaceae spp. (Except the species included in Appendix I and except Pereskia spp., Pereskiopsis spp. and Quiabentia spp.)
- Caecobarbus geertsii
- Caesalpinia echinata – Remains listed in Appendix II under this name, but now classified within Paubrasilia
- Calumma spp.
- Canis lupus (Except the populations of Bhutan, India, Nepal and Pakistan, which are included in Appendix I. Excludes the domesticated form, C. l. familiaris, and the dingo (C. l. dingo), which are not subject to the provisions of the Convention)
- Capra caucasica
- Carcharhinus falciformis (entry into effect delayed until 4 October 2017)
- Carcharhinus longimanus
- Carcharodon carcharias
- Carduelis yarrellii
- Carettochelys insculpta
- Caryocar costaricense
- Cephalophus brookei
- Cephalophus dorsalis
- Cephalophus ogilbyi
- Cephalophus silvicultor
- Cephalophus zebra
- Ceratotherium simum simum (Only the populations of Eswatini, Namibia, and South Africa; all other populations are included in Appendix I. For Eswatini and South Africa, populations are included in Appendix II for the exclusive purpose of allowing international trade in live animals to appropriate and acceptable destinations and hunting trophies. Namibian populations are included in Appendix II for the exclusive purpose of allowing international trade in live animals for in-situ conservation only, and only within the natural and historical range of C. simum in Africa. All other specimens shall be deemed to be specimens of species included in Appendix I and the trade in them shall be regulated accordingly.)
- Cerdocyon thous
- Cervus elaphus bactrianus
- Cetacea spp. (Except the species included in Appendix I. A zero annual export quota has been established for live specimens from the Black Sea population of Tursiops truncatus removed from the wild and traded for primarily commercial purposes)
- Cetorhinus maximus
- Chaetophractus nationi (A zero annual export quota has been established. All specimens shall be deemed to be specimens of species included in Appendix I and the trade in them shall be regulated accordingly)
- Chamaeleo spp.
- Cheilinus undulatus
- Chelodina mccordi (Zero export quota for specimens from the wild)
- Chitra spp. (Except the species included in Appendix I)
- Choeropsis liberiensis
- Chrysocyon brachyurus
- Cibotium barometz
- Ciconia nigra
- Cistanche deserticola
- Clelia clelia
- Clemmys guttata
- Conepatus humboldtii
- Conolophus spp.
- Cordylus spp.
- Corucia zebrata
- Coscoroba coscoroba
- Crocodilurus amazonicus
- Crocodylia spp. (Except the species included in Appendix I)
- Cryptoprocta ferox
- Ctenosaura bakeri
- Ctenosaura melanosterna
- Ctenosaura oedirhina
- Ctenosaura palearis
- Cuon alpinus
- Cuora spp. (Zero quota for wild specimens for commercial purposes for Cuora aurocapitata, C. bourreti, C. flavomarginata, C. galbinifrons, C. mccordi, C. mouhotii, C. pani, C. picturata, C. trifasciata, C. yunnanensis and C. zhoui)
- Cyathea spp.
- Cycadaceae spp. (Except the species included in Appendix I)
- Cyclagras gigas
- Cyclamen spp.
- Cyclanorbis elegans
- Cyclanorbis senegalensis
- Cyclemys spp.
- Cycloderma aubryi
- Cycloderma frenatum
- Cygnus melancoryphus
- Cynogale bennettii
- Cyornis ruckii
- Cyphostemma elephantopus
- Cyphostemma laza
- Cyphostemma montagnacii
- Cyprogenia aberti
- Dalbergia spp. (except for the species listed in Appendix I)
- Damaliscus pygargus pygargus
- Dendrobates spp.
- Dendrocygna arborea
- Dendrolagus inustus
- Dendrolagus ursinus
- Dermatemys mawii
- Dicksonia spp. (Only the populations of the Americas; no other population is included in the Appendices)
- Didiereaceae spp.
- Dionaea muscipula
- Dioscorea deltoidea
- Diospyros spp. (Populations of Madagascar)
- Dogania subplana
- Dracaena spp. "caiman lizards" or "water tegu"
- Dynastes satanas
- Dypsis decaryi
- Dyscophus antongilii
- Dyscophus guineti
- Dyscophus insularis
- Elachistodon westermanni
- Emydoidea blandingii
- Epioblasma torulosa rangiana
- Epipedobates spp.
- Equus hemionus (Except the subspecies included in Appendix I)
- Equus kiang
- Equus zebra hartmannae
- Equus zebra zebra
- Erymnochelys madagascariensis
- Eudocimus ruber
- Euphlyctis hexadactylus
- Euphorbia spp.(Succulent species only except Euphorbia misera and the species included in Appendix I. Artificially propagated specimens of cultivars of Euphorbia trigona, artificially propagated specimens of crested, fan-shaped or colour mutants of Euphorbia lactea, when grafted on artificially propagated root stock of Euphorbia neriifolia, and artificially propagated specimens of cultivars of Euphorbia ‘Milii’ when they are traded in shipments of 100 or more plants and readily recognizable as artificially propagated specimens, are not subject to the provisions of the Convention)
- Eupleres goudotii
- Excidobates spp.
- Falconiformes spp. (Except Caracara lutosa and the species of the family Cathartidae, which are not included in the Appendices; and the species included in Appendix I and III)
- Felidae spp. (Except the species included in Appendix I. Excludes specimens of the domesticated form, which are not subject to the provisions of the Convention. For Panthera leo (African populations): a zero annual export quota is established for specimens of bones, bone pieces, bone products, claws, skeletons, skulls and teeth removed from the wild and traded for commercial purposes. Annual export quotas for trade in bones, bone pieces, bone products, claws, skeletons, skulls and teeth for commercial purposes, derived from captive breeding operations in South Africa, will be established and communicated annually to the CITES Secretariat. P. leo populations of India are included in Appendix I.)
- Fossa fossana
- Fouquieria columnaris
- Furcifer spp.
- Galanthus spp.
- Gallicolumba luzonica
- Gallus sonneratii
- Garrulax canorus
- Garrulax taewanus
- Geoemyda japonica
- Geoemyda spengleri
- Geronticus calvus
- Glyptemys insculpta
- Gonystylus spp.
- Goura spp. "crowned pigeons"
- Gracula religiosa
- Gruidae spp. (Except the species included in Appendix I)
- Guaiacum spp.
- Gubernatrix cristata
- Guibourtia demeusei
- Guibourtia pellegriniana
- Guibourtia tessmannii
- Gyrinops spp.
- Hardella thurjii
- Hedychium philippinense
- Helioporidae spp. (Includes only the species Heliopora coerulea. Fossils are not subject to the provisions of the Convention)
- Heloderma spp. (Except the subspecies included in Appendix I)
- Hemicordylus spp.
- Hemigalus derbyanus
- Heosemys annandalii (Zero quota for wild specimens for commercial purposes)
- Heosemys depressa (Zero quota for wild specimens for commercial purposes)
- Heosemys grandis
- Heosemys spinosa
- Hexaprotodon liberiensis
- Hippocampus spp.
- Hippopotamus amphibius
- Hirudo medicinalis
- Hirudo verbana
- Holacanthus clarionensis
- Hoodia spp.
- Hoplobatrachus tigerinus
- Hoplocephalus bungaroides
- Hydrastis canadensis
- Hyloxalus azureiventris
- Iguana spp.
- Ithaginis cruentus
- Karusaurus spp.
- Kinyongia spp.
- Kobus leche
- Lama guanicoe
- Lamna nasus
- Lanthanotidae spp. (Zero export quota for wild specimens for commercial purposes)
- Leiothrix argentauris
- Leiothrix lutea
- Lemurophoenix halleuxii
- Leucocephalon yuwonoi
- Lewisia serrata
- Lichenostomus melanops cassidix
- Liocichla omeiensis
- Lissemys ceylonensis
- Lissemys punctata
- Lissemys scutata
- Lithophaga lithophaga
- Lonchura oryzivora
- Loxocemidae spp.
- Loxodonta africana 2 (Only the populations of Botswana, Namibia, South Africa, and Zimbabwe; all other populations are included in Appendix I) – The African forest elephant, now classified as L. cyclotis, is included in Appendix I as part of L. africana.
- Lutrinae spp. (Except the species included in Appendix I)
- Lycalopex culpaeus
- Lycalopex fulvipes
- Lycalopex griseus
- Lycalopex gymnocercus
- Malaclemys terrapin
- Malayemys macrocephala
- Malayemys subtrijuga
- Manis spp. (Except the species included in Appendix I)
- Manta spp. "manta rays"
- Mantella spp.
- Marojejya darianii
- Mauremys annamensis (Zero quota for wild specimens for commercial purposes)
- Mauremys japonica
- Mauremys mutica
- Mauremys nigricans
- Melanochelys trijuga
- Milleporidae spp. (Fossils are not subject to the provisions of the Convention)
- Minyobates spp.
- Mirounga leonina
- Mobula spp.
- Morenia petersi
- Moschus spp. (Except the populations of Afghanistan, Bhutan, India, Myanmar, Nepal, and Pakistan, which are included in Appendix I)
- Myrmecophaga tridactyla
- Nactus serpensinsula
- Nadzikambia spp.
- Naja atra
- Naja kaouthia
- Naja mandalayensis
- Naja naja
- Naja oxiana
- Naja philippinensis
- Naja sagittifera
- Naja samarensis
- Naja siamensis
- Naja sputatrix
- Naja sumatrana
- Namazonurus spp.
- Nardostachys grandiflora
- Naultinus spp.
- Nautilidae spp.
- Neoceratodus forsteri
- Nepenthes spp. (Except the species included in Appendix I)
- Nilssonia formosa
- Nilssonia leithii
- Ninurta spp.
- Nolina interrata
- Notochelys platynota
- Oophaga spp.
- Operculicarya decaryi
- Operculicarya hyphaenoides
- Operculicarya pachypus
- Ophiophagus hannah
- Orchidaceae spp. (Except the species included in Appendix I)
- Oreomunnea pterocarpa
- Orlitia borneensis (Zero quota for wild specimens for commercial purposes)
- Ornithoptera spp. (Except the species included in Appendix I)
- Osyris lanceolata (Populations of Burundi, Ethiopia, Kenya, Rwanda, Uganda, and Tanzania)
- Otididae spp. (Except the species included in Appendix I)
- Ouroborus spp.
- Ovis ammon (Except the subspecies included in Appendix I)
- Ovis aries (Except the subspecies included in Appendix I, the subspecies O. a. isphahanica, O. a. laristanica, O. a. musimon, and O. a. orientalis which are not included in the Appendices, and the domesticated form Ovis aries aries which is not subject to the provisions of the Convention)
- Ovis canadensis (Only the population of Mexico; no other population is included in the Appendices)
- Oxyura leucocephala
- Pachypodium spp. (Except the species included in Appendix I)
- Palea steindachneri
- Palleon spp.
- Panax ginseng (Only the population of the Russia; no other population is included in the Appendices)
- Panax quinquefolius
- Pandinus dictator
- Pandinus gambiensis
- Pandinus imperator
- Pandinus roeseli
- Pangshura spp. (Except the species included in Appendix I)
- Papilio hospiton
- Papustyla pulcherrima
- Paradisaeidae spp.
- Paramesotriton hongkongensis
- Parnassius apollo
- Paroaria capitata
- Paroaria coronata
- Paroedura masobe
- Pavo muticus
- Pelochelys spp.
- Pelodiscus axenaria
- Pelodiscus maackii
- Pelodiscus parviformis
- Peltocephalus dumerilianus
- Penelopides spp.
- Pericopsis elata
- Phalanger intercastellanus
- Phalanger mimicus
- Phalanger orientalis
- Phelsuma spp.
- Philantomba monticola
- Phoenicopteridae spp.
- Phrynosoma blainvillii
- Phrynosoma cerroense
- Phrynosoma coronatum
- Phrynosoma wigginsi
- Phyllobates spp.
- Picrorhiza kurrooa (Excludes Picrorhiza scrophulariiflora)
- Pitta guajana
- Pitta nympha
- Platalea leucorodia
- Platymiscium pleiostachyum
- Pleurobema clava
- Podarcis lilfordi
- Podarcis pityusensis
- Podocnemis spp.
- Podophyllum hexandrum
- Poephila cincta cincta
- Polyplectron bicalcaratum
- Polyplectron germaini
- Polyplectron malacense
- Polyplectron schleiermacheri
- Primates spp. (Except the species included in Appendix I)
- Prionodon linsang
- Prunus africana
- Pseudocordylus spp.
- Psittaciformes spp. (Except the species included in Appendix I and Agapornis roseicollis, Melopsittacus undulatus, Nymphicus hollandicus, and Psittacula krameri, which are not included in the Appendices)
- Pterocarpus erinaceus
- Pterocarpus santalinus
- Pterocnemia pennata pennata
- Pteroglossus aracari
- Pteroglossus viridis
- Pteropus spp. (Except the species included in Appendix I and Pteropus brunneus)
- Ptyas mucosus
- Pudu mephistophiles
- Pythonidae spp. (Except the subspecies included in Appendix I)
- Rafetus euphraticus
- Rafetus swinhoei
- Ramphastos sulfuratus
- Ramphastos toco
- Ramphastos tucanus
- Ramphastos vitellinus
- Ranitomeya spp.
- Ratufa spp.
- Rauvolfia serpentina
- Ravenea louvelii
- Ravenea rivularis
- Rhampholeon spp.
- Rhea americana
- Rheobatrachus spp. (Except Rheobatrachus silus and Rheobatrachus vitellinus which are not included in the Appendices)
- Rhincodon typus
- Rhoptropella spp.
- Rhyticeros spp. (Except the species included in Appendix I)
- Rieppeleon spp.
- Rupicapra pyrenaica ornata
- Rupicola spp.
- Saara spp.
- Sacalia bealei
- Sacalia quadriocellata
- Saiga borealis – Remains protected under this name, but now classified by most authorities as S. tatarica borealis
- Saiga tatarica
- Salvator spp.
- Sarkidiornis melanotos
- Sarracenia spp. (Except the species included in Appendix I)
- Satranala decussilvae
- Scandentia spp.
- Scaphiophryne boribory
- Scaphiophryne gottlebei
- Scaphiophryne marmorata
- Scaphiophryne spinosa
- Scleractinia spp. (Fossils are not subject to the provisions of the Convention)
- Senna meridionalis
- Siebenrockiella crassicollis
- Siebenrockiella leytensis
- Siphonochilus aethiopicus (Populations of Mozambique, South Africa, Eswatini, and Zimbabwe)
- Smaug spp.
- Spheniscus demersus
- Sphyrna lewini
- Sphyrna mokarran
- Sphyrna zygaena
- Spilocuscus kraemeri
- Spilocuscus maculatus
- Spilocuscus papuensis
- Sternbergia spp.
- Strigiformes spp. (Except the species included in Appendix I and Sceloglaux albifacies)
- Strombus gigas
- Stylasteridae spp. (Fossils are not subject to the provisions of the Convention)
- Swietenia humilis
- Swietenia macrophylla (Populations of the Neotropics)
- Swietenia mahagoni
- Tangara fastuosa
- Tapirus terrestris
- Tauraco spp.
- Taxus chinensis and infraspecific taxa of this species
- Taxus cuspidata and infraspecific taxa of this species
- Taxus fuana (a synonym of Taxus contorta) and infraspecific taxa of this species
- Taxus sumatrana and infraspecific taxa of this species
- Taxus wallichiana
- Tayassuidae spp. "peccaries" (Except the species included in Appendix I and the populations of Pecari tajacu of Mexico and the United States of America, which are not included in the Appendices)
- Teinopalpus spp.
- Terrapene spp. (Except the species included in Appendix I)
- Testudinidae spp. (Except the species included in Appendix I. A zero annual export quota has been established for Centrochelys sulcata for specimens removed from the wild and traded for primarily commercial purposes)
- Tillandsia harrisii
- Tillandsia kammii
- Tillandsia xerographica
- Tridacnidae spp.
- Trimeresurus mangshanensis
- Trioceros spp.
- Trionyx triunguis
- Trochilidae spp. (Except the species included in Appendix I)
- Trogonoptera spp.
- Troides spp.
- Tropidophiidae spp.
- Tubiporidae spp. (Fossils are not subject to the provisions of the Convention)
- Tupinambis spp.
- Tympanuchus cupido attwateri
- Uncarina grandidieri
- Uncarina stellulifera
- Uromastyx spp.
- Uroplatus spp.
- Ursidae spp. (Except the species included in Appendix I)
- Varanus spp. (Except the species included in Appendix I)
- Vicugna vicugna (Only the populations of Argentina (the populations of the Provinces of Jujuy and Catamarca and the semi-captive populations of the Provinces of Jujuy, Salta, Catamarca, La Rioja and San Juan), Chile (population of the Primera Región), Ecuador (the whole population), Peru (the whole population) and Bolivia (the whole population); all other populations are included in Appendix I) – Remains protected under this name, but now classified as Lama vicugna
- Vijayachelys silvatica
- Vipera wagneri
- Voanioala gerardii
- Vulpes cana
- Vulpes zerda
- Welwitschia mirabilis
- Yucca queretaroensis
- Zaglossus spp.
- Zamiaceae spp. (Except the species included in Appendix I)
- Zygosicyos pubescens
- Zygosicyos tripartitus
