= A. laeta =

A. laeta may refer to:

- Acacia laeta, a perennial legume
- Aegiphila laeta, a plant with decussate leaves
- Aloe laeta, a succulent plant
- Anilara laeta, a jewel beetle
- Aplogompha laeta, a geometer moth
- Archanara laeta, a North American moth
- Aspalathus laeta, a cape gorse
