= List of species protected by CITES Appendix III =

This is a list of species of plants and animals protected by Appendix III of the Convention on International Trade in Endangered Species of Wild Fauna and Flora, commonly abbreviated as CITES. There are no fungi listed in any appendix.

- List of species protected by CITES Appendix I
- List of species protected by CITES Appendix II

== Appendix III ==
- Acrocephalus rodericanus - Rodrigues warbler (Mauritius)
- Agrias amydon boliviensis (Bolivia)
- Morpho godartii lachaumei (Bolivia)
- Prepona praeneste buckleyana (Bolivia)
- Antilope cervicapra - blackbuck (Nepal, Pakistan)
- Apalone ferox - Florida softshell turtle (United States of America)
- Apalone mutica - smooth softshell turtle (United States of America)
- Apalone spinifera - spiny softshell turtle (Except the subspecies included in Appendix I) (United States of America)
- Arctictis binturong = binturong (India)
- Atretium schistosum - split keelback (India)
- Axis porcinus - Indian hog deer (Except the subspecies included in Appendix I) (Pakistan)
- Baillonius bailloni - saffron toucanet (Argentina)
- Bassaricyon gabbii - northern olingo (Costa Rica)
- Bassariscus sumichrasti - cacomistle (Costa Rica)
- Boselaphus tragocamelus - nilgai (Pakistan)
- Bubalus arnee - wild water buffalo (Excludes the domesticated form, Bubalus bubalis and is not subject to the provisions of the Convention) (Nepal)
- Burhinus bistriatus - double-striped thick-knee (Guatemala)
- Cabassous centralis (Costa Rica)
- Cabassous tatouay (Uruguay)
- Cairina moschata - Muscovy duck (Excludes the domesticated form, Cairina moschata domestica)
- Calyptocephalella gayi (Chile)
- Canis aureus (India)
- Capra hircus aegagrus (Specimens of the domesticated form are not subject to the provisions of the Convention) (Pakistan)
- Capra sibirica (Pakistan)
- Cedrela fissilis (Bolivia, Brazil)
- Cedrela lilloi (Bolivia, Brazil)
- Cedrela odorata (Brazil and Bolivia. In addition, the following countries have listed their national populations: Colombia, Guatemala, and Peru)
- Cephalopterus ornatus (Colombia)
- Cephalopterus penduliger (Colombia)
- Cerberus rynchops (India)
- Cervus elaphus barbarus (Algeria, Tunisia)
- Chelydra serpentina (United States of America)
- Choloepus hoffmanni (Costa Rica)
- Civettictis civetta (Botswana)
- Colophon spp. (South Africa)
- Corallium elatius (China)
- Corallium japonicum (China)
- Corallium konjoi (China)
- Corallium secundum (China)
- Crax alberti (Colombia)
- Crax daubentoni (Colombia)
- Crax globulosa (Colombia)
- Crax rubra (Colombia, Costa Rica, Guatemala, Honduras)
- Crotalus durissus (Honduras)
- Cryptobranchus alleganiensis (United States of America)
- Cuniculus paca (Honduras)
- Daboia russelii (India)
- Dactylocnemis spp. (New Zealand)
- Dasyprocta punctata (Honduras)
- Dendrocygna autumnalis (Honduras)
- Dendrocygna bicolor (Honduras)
- Dipteryx panamensis (Costa Rica, Nicaragua)
- Eira barbara (Honduras)
- Fraxinus mandshurica (Russia)
- Galictis vittata (Costa Rica)
- Gazella bennettii (Pakistan)
- Gazella dorcas (Algeria, Tunisia)
- Gnetum montanum (Nepal)
- Graptemys spp. (United States of America)
- Herpestes edwardsi (India, Pakistan)
- Herpestes fuscus (India)
- Herpestes javanicus (Pakistan)
- Herpestes javanicus auropunctatus (India)
- Herpestes smithii (India)
- Herpestes urva (India)
- Herpestes vitticollis (India)
- Hoplodactylus spp. (New Zealand)
- Hyaena hyaena (Pakistan)
- Hynobius amjiensis (China)
- Hypancistrus zebra (Brazil)
- Isostichopus fuscus (Ecuador)
- Lodoicea maldivica (Seychelles)
- Lophura leucomelanos (Pakistan)
- Macrochelys temminckii (United States of America)
- Magnolia liliifera var. obovata (Nepal)
- Marmota caudata (India)
- Marmota himalayana (India)
- Martes flavigula (India)
- Martes foina intermedia (India)
- Martes gwatkinsii (India)
- Mauremys iversoni (China)
- Mauremys megalocephala (China)
- Mauremys pritchardi (China)
- Mauremys reevesii (China)
- Mauremys sinensis (China)
- Mazama temama cerasina (Guatemala)
- Meconopsis regia (Nepal)
- Meleagris ocellata (Guatemala)
- Mellivora capensis (Botswana)
- Micrurus diastema (Honduras)
- Micrurus nigrocinctus (Honduras)
- Micrurus ruatanus (Honduras)
- Mokopirirakau spp. (New Zealand)
- Mustela altaica (India)
- Mustela erminea ferghanae (India)
- Mustela kathiah (India)
- Mustela sibirica (India)
- Nasua narica (Honduras)
- Nasua nasua solitaria (Uruguay)
- Nesoenas mayeri (Mauritius)
- Ocadia glyphistoma (China)
- Ocadia philippeni (China)
- Odobenus rosmarus (Canada)
- Odocoileus virginianus mayensis (Guatemala)
- Ortalis vetula (Guatemala, Honduras)
- Paguma larvata (India)
- Paradoxurus hermaphroditus (India)
- Paradoxurus jerdoni (India)
- Paratrygon aiereba (Colombia)
- Pauxi pauxi (Colombia)
- Pavo cristatus (Pakistan)
- Penelope purpurascens (Honduras)
- Penelopina nigra (Guatemala)
- Pinus koraiensis (Russia)
- Platyrrhinus lineatus (Uruguay)
- Podocarpus neriifolius (Nepal)
- Potamotrygon constellata (Colombia)
- Potamotrygon magdalenae (Colombia)
- Potamotrygon motoro (Colombia)
- Potamotrygon orbignyi (Colombia)
- Potamotrygon schroederi (Colombia)
- Potamotrygon scobina (Colombia)
- Potamotrygon spp. (population of Brazil)
- Potamotrygon yepezi (Colombia)
- Potos flavus (Honduras)
- Proteles cristata (Botswana)
- Pseudois nayaur (Pakistan)
- Pteroglossus castanotis (Argentina)
- Pucrasia macrolopha (Pakistan)
- Quercus mongolica (Russia)
- Ramphastos dicolorus (Argentina)
- Sacalia pseudocellata (China)
- Salamandra algira (Algeria)
- Sarcoramphus papa (Honduras)
- Sciurus deppei (Costa Rica)
- Selenidera maculirostris (Argentina)
- Semnornis ramphastinus (Colombia)
- Sphiggurus mexicanus (Honduras)
- Sphiggurus spinosus (Uruguay)
- Tamandua mexicana (Guatemala)
- Terpsiphone bourbonnensis (Mauritius)
- Tetracentron sinense (Nepal)
- Tetracerus quadricornis (Nepal)
- Toropuku spp. (New Zealand)
- Tragopan satyra (Nepal)
- Tukutuku spp. - Harlequin gecko (New Zealand)
- Viverra civettina (India)
- Viverra zibetha (India)
- Viverricula indica (India)
- Vulpes bengalensis (India)
- Vulpes vulpes griffithi (India)
- Vulpes vulpes montana (India)
- Vulpes vulpes pusilla (India)
- Woodworthia spp. (New Zealand)
- Xenochrophis piscator (India)
- Xenochrophis schnurrenbergeri (India)
- Xenochrophis tytleri (India)
