= Rupicola =

Genus of plants

Rupicola was a small genus of flowering plants in the family Ericaceae. The species placed in the genus are endemic to New South Wales in Australia.

In 2015 it was found that genus Epacris is paraphyletic to Rupicola and Budawangia, and the names Rupicola and Budawangia are now regarded as a synonyms of Epacris by the Australian Plant Census and Plants of the World Online.

The species formerly placed in Rupicola are heaths of limited distributions, found in cliff habitats in the Blue Mountains of New South Wales. Their growth habits vary from decumbent or pendulous to more erect. Their flowers are white with short tubes and five lobes, and are, like in other epacrids, carried singly in leaf axils near the ends of the stems.

== Etymology ==
The name Rupicola is formed from "rupes-is, a cliff, and cola, an inhabitant".

== Taxonomy and systematics ==
Rupicola was established as a monotypic genus by Joseph Maiden and Ernst Betche in 1898 containing the single species Rupicola sprengelioides (now Epacris sprengelioides). Though it has some features in common with Prionotes and Sprengelia, they noted that the new species "strikingly resembles the Tasmanian Epacris mucronulata, R.Br." They placed it adjacent to Epacris in tribe Epacrideae, an affinity that was supported by Watson in 1967 and Powell in 1987.

In 1927, Summerhayes described a second species Rupicola gnidioides (now Epacris gnidioides).

Ian Telford in 1992 revised the genus. He removed R. gnidioides to a new genus Budawangia. Two new species were described – Rupicola ciliata and Rupicola decumbens – plus Epacris apiculata was considered to be mis-classified and was moved from Epacris to Rupicola. Members of Rupicola were distinguished by having their stamens inserted at the base of the corolla, in contrast to those of Epacris and Budawangia, which have them attached at the mouth of the corolla tube. Budawangia gnidioides has hypogynous swellings which "appear to have no nectary function", and Rupicola species have no nectary structures. In Epacris the species generally have well-developed nectary scales. In Rupicola, the anthers open with a short apical slit, unlike most members of Epacridoideae which form a full-length slit. In other subfamilies the anthers open with a short slit or a pore.

In the latter 1990s, Crayn et al. compared sequences for the plastid gene rbcL and suggested that Epacris may be paraphyletic to Rupicola and Budawangia. In 2015, Quinn et al. studied 45 morphological characteristics along with genetic indels from the plastid atpB–rbcL non-coding region. They found that the two smaller genera together formed a group within Epacris, and that although there were discernible clades in Epacris, none were "readily recognisable on morphological features", hence there was no cause to split it into smaller genera along cladistic lines. The authors point out that in the Ericaceae family more widely, stamen filaments attached to the corolla tube have arisen independently multiple times, that attachment may be weak, and that reversion to the original plesiomorphic state is not uncommon. In their analyses, the Rupicola–Budawangia group was related to E. calvertiana, E. coriacea, E. gunnii, E. microphylla, and E. purpurascens.

They proposed moving all five species into Epacris. The epithet ciliata is already occupied by Epacris ciliata (R.Br.) Poir. (1812), so a new name for Rupicola ciliata was given: Epacris pilosa Crowden 2015. For the three other species which had not previously been members of Epacris, new combinations were proposed with co-author Elizabeth Anne Brown as the taxonomic authority.

Thus the concepts for Rupicola have been:

- Rupicola sensu Maiden & Betche 1898: R. sprengelioides Maiden & Betche.
- Rupicola sensu Summerhayes 1927: R. sprengelioides Maiden & Betche, R. gnidioides Summerh.
- Rupicola sensu Telford 1992: R. sprengelioides Maiden & Betche, R. apiculata (A.Cunn.) I.Telford, R. ciliata I.Telford, R. decumbens I.Telford.
- Rupicola sensu Quinn, Crowden, Brown, et al. 2015: grouping of species within Epacris. Names: E. apiculata A.Cunn., E. decumbens (I.Telford) E.A.Brown, E. pilosa Crowden, E. sprengelioides (Maiden & Betche) E.A.Brown.
