= Aloe albida =

Conservation status
- CITES Appendix I (CITES)

Scientific classification
- Kingdom: Plantae
- Clade: Tracheophytes
- Clade: Angiosperms
- Clade: Monocots
- Order: Asparagales
- Family: Asphodelaceae
- Subfamily: Asphodeloideae
- Genus: Aloe
- Species: A. albida

Binomial name
- Aloe albida (Stapf) Reynolds

Synonyms
- Aloe kraussii var. minor Baker; Aloe myriacantha var. minor (Baker) A.Berger; Leptaloe albida Stapf

Species of succulent

Aloe albida is a dwarf species of succulent plant.

== Characteristics ==
Its flowers are small, white and borne on a single inflorescence. Its flowering time is usually in early autumn (March–April in the Southern Hemisphere), although it may begin to flower as early as February. The leaves form a rosette and have a waxy coating, which gives them a pale greyish/bluish green colour.

== Habitat ==
It grows in montane grassland and in crevices among rocks where grasses are kept fairly short. It is found on the mountains in Barberton in Mpumalanga Province of South Africa to the northern border, of as well as parts of Eswatini (Swaziland).

== See also ==
- Aloe
- Asphodelaceae
- Succulent plants
