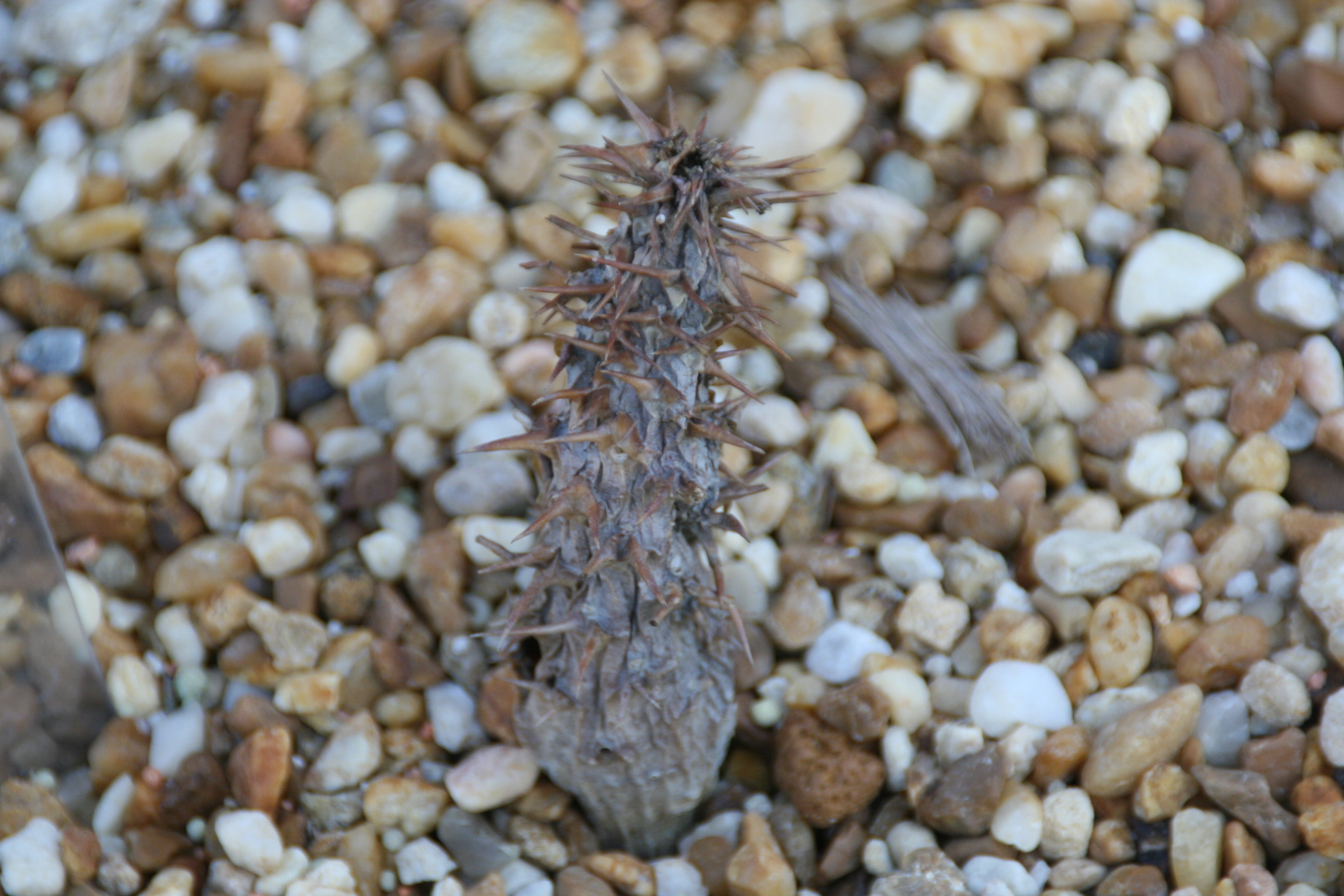

Conservation status
- CITES Appendix I (CITES)

Scientific classification
- Kingdom: Plantae
- Clade: Tracheophytes
- Clade: Angiosperms
- Clade: Eudicots
- Clade: Asterids
- Order: Gentianales
- Family: Apocynaceae
- Genus: Pachypodium
- Species: P. ambongense

Binomial name
- Pachypodium ambongense Poiss.

= Pachypodium ambongense =

Species of flowering plant

Pachypodium ambongense is a species of plant in the family Apocynaceae. It was first published as a species of the genus Pachypodium in 1924 by the botanist Henri Louis Poisson.

Having a habit as a shrub that is 1–2 m (3 1/2–6 1/2 ft) and bottle-shaped, Pachypodium ambongense inhabits the western low, open deciduous forest of Madagascar on a substrate of Mesozoic calcareous rock. It is fairly rare to the landscape, perhaps, suggesting a more specialized environment needed for it to grow. It is known by common name in Madagascar as "Songosongo" or "Betono."

== Morphology ==
=== Habit ===
As a shrub 1–2 m (3 1/2–6 1/2 ft) high with a subglobose, not entirely spherical, laterally compressed, flattened on a side habit; it has a diameter ranging from 10–40 cm (4–16 in). Overall it resembles a bottle-shape in habit.

The bark is grey-green and smooth or it has leaf scars. Overall Pachypodium ambongense has a bottle-shaped profile. Its short branches form right below the terminal inflorescence and measure from 7–18 cm (3–7 in) in diameter. P. ambongense's branchlets are 18 mm–40 mm × 5 mm–6 mm (11/16 in–1 9/16 in × 3/16 in–1/4 in). They are covered with paired straight spines, 20 mm–100 mm × 5 mm–30 mm (3/4 in–4 in × 1/4 in–1 1/4 in) at the base. When young they are sparsely pubescent, or hairy.

=== Leaves ===
The leaves are confined near the apices, the apex or the highest point, of the branchlets. They are petiolate, meaning that they have a leave stalk. The petiole, or stalk roughly, is 2–10 mm (1/16–3/8 in) long. While being sparsely pubescent and hairy, the blade(s) are dark green with a midrib that is pale green above and pale green to pale grey beneath when fresh. When dry, the leave is papery. They are shaped as being (I) ovate--broad and rounded at the base and tapering toward the end—to (II) obovate--egg-shaped and flat, like ovate, but with a narrower end—measuring 1.9 to 3.4 times as long as they are wide. Therefore, the leaves often range in size from 3.5 cm (1.38 inch) to 9 cm (0.35 inch) in length by 1.5 cm (0.59 inch) to 3 cm (1.18 inch) in width. They are obtuse--having a blunt or rounded tip—to rounded in shape at the apex. Cuneate--wedge-shaped, narrowly triangular at the base—or decurrent--having the leaf base that extends down the stem below its point of insertion—into the petiole, the leaves have a margin that is revolute, the margins rolled backwards, and glabrous, smooth above with impressed reticulate venation. They are densely pubescent, hairy, underneath with a midrib and secondary veins prominently showing. There are 23 to 32 secondary veins in pairs, which are straight at the base, up curved at the apex, and forming an angle of 45-85° with the Costa, the rib, ridge in a midrib of a leaf. The tertiary venation is reticulate, either making a net or network of veins or marking with lines resembling a network. They are hidden by the indumentum, any covering of hairs etc., beneath the leaf.

=== Inflorescence ===
The inflorescence is sessile, with a petiolate or stalk, or shortly pedunculate, a short main axis of the entire inflorescence. Its flower is congested with dimensions that read 6 cm (0.24 inch) to 8 cm (0.32 inch) by 3 cm (1.18 inch) to 5 cm (1.97 inch). The inflorescence has 1 to 8 flowers. The peduncle, again the main axis of the inflorescence, is dark green and is 0 mm (0 inch) to 5 mm (0.20 inch) in length by 2 mm (0.08 inch) by 4 mm (0.16 inch) in width. The inflorescence is sparsely pubescent to glabrous. The pedicels, the stalks of single flowers, are green, 4 mm (0.16 inch) to 10 mm (0.39 inch) long, and sparsely pubescent to glabrous. Bracts, for the inflorescence, are ovate, flattened egg-shaped, 2 mm (0.8 inch) by 1 mm (0.04 inch), and acuminate, tapering gradually to a sharp point, at the apex. The bracts are pubescent outside and glabrous inside.

=== Flower ===
The flowers of Pachypodium ambongense have sepals that are pale green. (Usually all sepals are some shade of green.) The sepals are connate at the base, uniting the sepals into one morphological structure, for about 0.2 mm (0.007 inch). They are persistent, lasting past maturity without falling off, and ovate--flattened egg shaped profile—or narrowly ovate. They measure 1.5 mm (.059 inch) to 2 mm (0.079 inch) long insomuch as they are wide at 3 mm (0.118 inch) to 4 mm (0.159 inch) by 2 mm (0.079 inch) to 2.2 mm (0.087 inch). The sepals are acuminate, ending in a point at the apex, and can have stiff hairs at the apex. The sepals are typically sparsely pubescent, hairy, or glabrous, smooth, outside, and almost always glabrous inside.

==== Corolla ====
The corolla of Pachypodium ambongense is limb white with the tube being pale greenish-yellow outside and with a throat that is yellowish-green inside. It measures 4.3 cm (0.17 inch) to 6 cm (0.24 inch) long in the mature bud and forms a comparatively wide broadly ovoid, shaped like an egg--ovate-like without being flat—head, which is 3.8 cm (1.5 inch) to 4.0 cm (0.16 inch) of the bud length. The head of the corolla appears to be 17 mm (0.67 inch) by 23 mm (0.91 inch) in length by 4 mm (0.16 inch) to 10 mm (0.39 inch) in width. It is obtuse, having a blunt or rounded tip, at the apex. As well, the head of the corolla is glabrous, smooth outside, with a sparsely pubescent, hairy belt inside that is 7 mm (0.28 inch) wide and located just below the insertion point of the stamens. Otherwise, the corolla head is glabrous with a tube that is 10.5 to 12.3 times as long as the calyx, the outermost series of leaves, collectively called the sepals. Moreover the calyx is 1.4 to 1.8 times as long as the lobes, measuring at 3.7 cm (1.46 inch) to 4.2 cm (1.65 inches) long. The basal part of the corolla tube is narrowly cylindrical and is half of the length of the entire tube at 19 mm (0.75 inch) to 21 mm (0.83 inch) in length by 1.5 mm (0.059 inch) to 2 mm (0.079 inch) wide. The upper segment of the basal part is urceolate, or urn-shaped, and clearly narrowed at the throat, measuring 18 mm (.71 inch) to 21 mm (0.83 inch) long by 3mm (0.12 inch) by 4 mm (0.16 inch) wide at the mouth. The corolla lobes are obliquely ovate, a flatten egg-shape profile—running at 0.52 to 0.7 times as long as the corolla tube, which is 1.6 to 2 times as long it is wide. It measures 21 mm (.83 inch) to 30 mm (1.18 inch) by 11 mm (0.43 inch) to 15 mm (0.59 inch). The corolla lobes are obtuse at the apex of the tube.

==== Stamens ====
The stamens, the male reproductive "organ" of a flower, have an apex that is 6 mm (0.24 inch) below the mouth of the corolla tube. They are inserted--below the sepals and petals of a flower—at 0.62 of the length of the corolla tube with a total length of 2.5 cm (0.98 inch) from the base. The anthers are very narrowly triangular at 5.25 to 5.75 times as long they are wide at 10.5 mm (0.41 inch) to 11.5 (0.45 inch) mm by 2 mm (0.078 inch). They are sparsely pubescent, hairy inside at the base of the connective, just below where they are located at the base of the pistil head. The fertile part of the pistil is 5 mm (0.20 inch) long. The stamens have an apex of 6 mm (0.24 inch) below the mouth of the corolla tube, inserted at 0.62 of the length of the corolla tube. That places it 2.5 cm (0.98 inch) from the base. Again the anthers are very narrowly triangular, 5.25-5.75 times as they are long as they are wide at 10.5 to 11.5 time 2 mm (0.078 inch). The anthers are sparsely pubescent inside at the base of the connective and just below where they occur with the base of the pistil head.

==== Pistils ====
The pistil, the female organ of reproduction in a flower, on Pachypodium ambongense is 2.7 cm (01.06 inch) long. The ovary is 2 times 1.3 mm (0.51 inch) times 1.2 mm (0.47 inch). It is glabrous, and its disk is urceolate, urn-shape, 2.5 mm (0.98 inch) high. The pistil abruptly narrows at the throat. It is 5-lobed at the apex and entirely covers the ovary. The glabrous, smooth style--the usually slender part of a pistil, situated between the ovary and the stigma—is 22.7 mm (0.89 inch) long where it widens at the apex. The pistil head is 2.3 mm (.091 inch) high composed of an obconical--conical, but having the apex downward; inversely conical—basal part 1.3 times 0.6 mm (0.024 inch). The basal part has a ring-shaped central part 0.5 times 1.3 mm (0.051 inch) and a stigmoid--resembling the letter "S" or the lower-case Greek letter sigma (ς)--apex half the 0.9 mm (0.0395 inch). The ovules are approximately 50 in count in each carpel--one of the structural units of a pistil, representing a modified, ovule-bearing leaf.

=== Fruit ===
Rapanarivo et al. base this data on Lavranos' earlier work

The fruit of Pachypodium ambongense consists of two mericaps, a carpel with one seed or one of a pair split apart at maturity. The mericaps are dark brown outside and whitish inside when dried. They are fusiform, tapering at each end and spindle-shaped. They measure approximately 15 cm (5.91 inch) in length and 1 cm (3.94 inch) in width. The encasement wall of the seeds is thin at 0.5 mm ( .0.020 inch) thick.

== Habitat ==
=== Distribution ===
Endemic to Madagascar. The Namoroka Nat. 8. Rare in the landscape.

=== Ecology ===
Pachypodium ambongense grows on strongly eroded, Mesozoic calcareous rocks where the fissures are filled with humus. in the low open deciduous forest of the Western Forest zone, tolerating full sun to part sun. This habitat is consistency with the general tendency of Pachypodium to inhabit the western side of the island. Growing on a calcareous substrate suggests that this plant prefers only basic soil conditions, as Rapanarivo et al. did not find P. ambongense growing on other substrates as some species of Pachypodium do. Also its preference for low open forest mean that it can be found growing at an altitude of 100 m (328 feet) or less.

The plants that are often associated with its habitat are: Adenia firingalavensis Harms (Passifloraceae); Aloe sp. (Asphodelaceae); Cissus sp. (Vitaceae); Euphorbia viguieri (Euphorbiaceae); Lomatophyllum sp. (Liliaceae); Pachypodium rutenbergianum (Apocynaceae); Pandanus sp. (Pandanaceae); Uncarina sakalava Uncarina perrieri (Pedaliaceae); and Xerosicyos perrieri (Cucurbitaceae). Associated plants are key to understanding the ecology of a taxon because they often act as site indicators as to what the habitat consists of in the landscape and within the climate.

== Cultivation ==
=== Based on W. Röösli within Rapanarivo et al. "Cultivation" ===
The[substrate should be loose peat with lime gravel. Temperatures from Spring to Autumn, as varied by night and day, should be between 18 °C (64.4 °F) and 38 °C (100.4 °F). To keep it in the winter temperatures should be between nocturnal 15 °C (59 °F) and diurnal 20 °C (68 °F). While in the dry season, moisten the soil only when the soil dries out completely, then only water slightly; so that the soil does not dry out completely. After the dry season, it needs a lot of water. It flowers after the Dry Season. When the Dry Season begins it does not say by Röösli or Rapanarivo et al.'s account of the habitat. Presumably, Winter would be the dry season unless otherwise noted, as is the case for Pachypodium namaquanum. In fact, Rowley states that all Pachypodium can be kept growing year round so long the temperature is like normal growing temperatures, which can be achieved under lights and in a Greenhouse. Growing year-round would likely interfere with the taxon's bloom cycle, it stand to reason.

== Literature ==
- Rapanarivo, S.H.J.V., Lavranos, J.J., Leeuwenberg, A.J.M., and Röösli, W. Pachypodium (Apocynaceae): Taxonomy, habitats and cultivation "Taxonomic revision of the genus Pachyypodium", S.H.J.V. Rapanarivo and J.J. Lavranos; "The habitats of Pachyppodium species" S.H.J.V. Rapanarivo; "Cultivation" W. Röösli. (A.A. Balkema: Rotterdam, Brokkfield, 1999) [The rest of the list is based on Rapanarivo et al.]
- In 1924, Henri Louis Poisson published Pachypodium ambongense in the journal abbreviated "Bull. Acad. Malgache" sér. 2, 6: 162, pl. 5 (1924).
- The botanists Perrier de la Bâthie published a further account in "Bulletin de la Société Botanique de France." 81: 307 (1934).
- The botanist Marcel Pichon mentions the taxon in abbreviated from "Mem. Inst. Sc. Madag.", sér. B, 2: 112 (1949) in 1949.
- Most recently, Friedrich Markgraf in 1976 published an account of the taxon in "Fl. Madag." fam. 169: 288 (1976).

The type specimen for Pachypodium ambongense is: Madagascar, Majunga (Mahajanga), Namoroka Res., Perrier de la Bâthie 1515 (holotype P). Fig. 1, p. 11; Map 1, p. 12; Plate 1, opposite p. 16.
