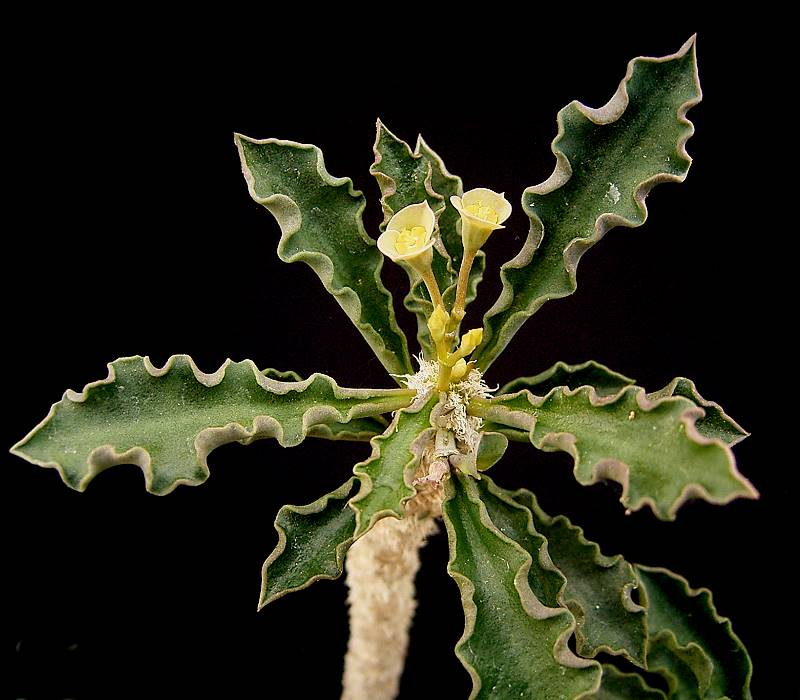

Conservation status
- Critically Endangered (IUCN 3.1)
- CITES Appendix I

Scientific classification
- Kingdom: Plantae
- Clade: Tracheophytes
- Clade: Angiosperms
- Clade: Eudicots
- Clade: Rosids
- Order: Malpighiales
- Family: Euphorbiaceae
- Genus: Euphorbia
- Species: E. cap-saintemariensis

Binomial name
- Euphorbia cap-saintemariensis Rauh

= Euphorbia cap-saintemariensis =

Species of flowering plant

Euphorbia cap-saintemariensis is a species of plant in the family Euphorbiaceae. It is endemic to Madagascar. Its natural habitat is rocky areas. It is threatened by habitat loss.
