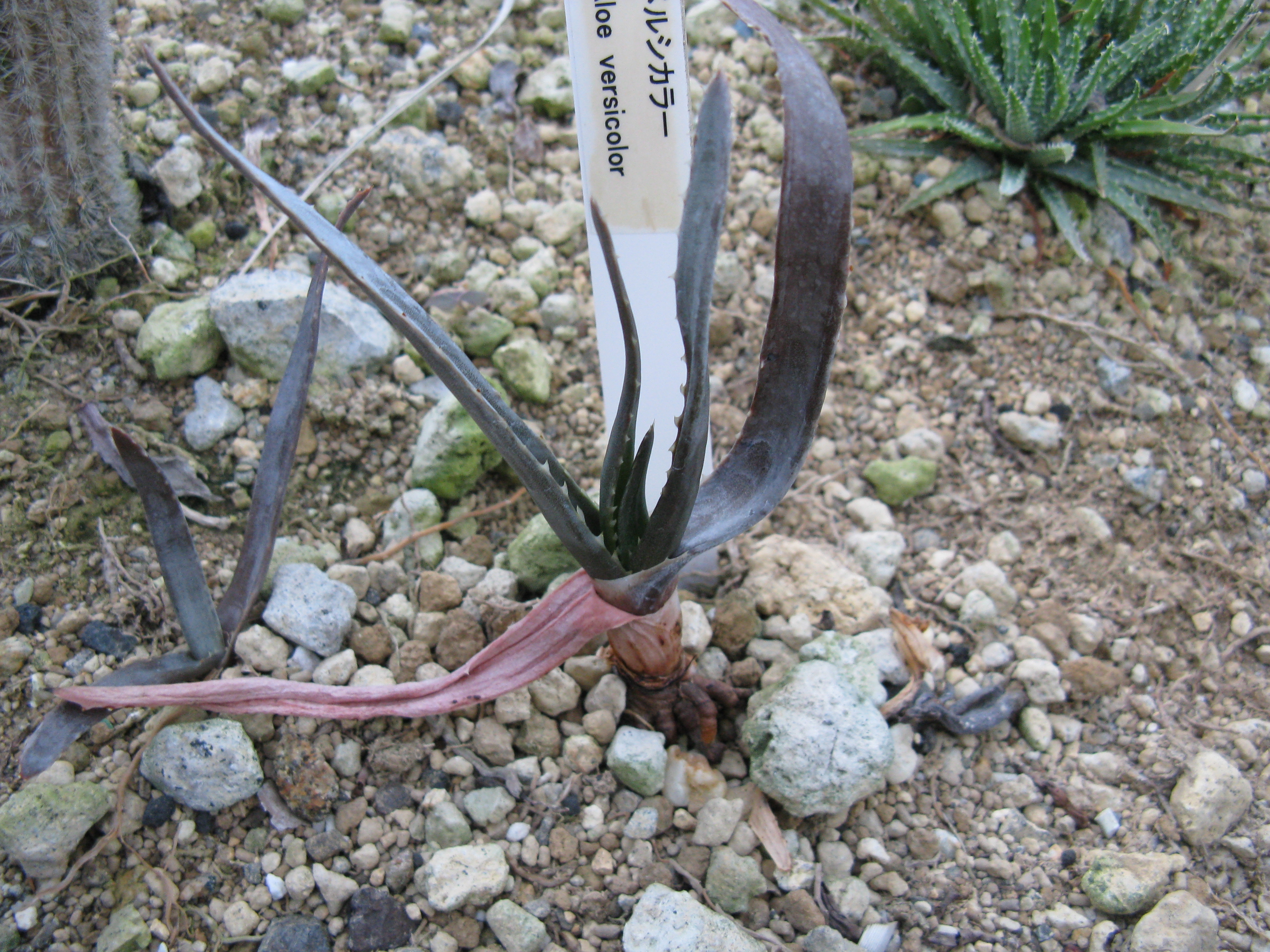

Conservation status
- Endangered (IUCN 2.3)
- CITES Appendix I (CITES)

Scientific classification
- Kingdom: Plantae
- Clade: Tracheophytes
- Clade: Angiosperms
- Clade: Monocots
- Order: Asparagales
- Family: Asphodelaceae
- Subfamily: Asphodeloideae
- Genus: Aloe
- Species: A. versicolor

Binomial name
- Aloe versicolor Guillaumin

= Aloe versicolor =

Species of succulent

Aloe versicolor is an aloe that is part of the Asphodelaceae family. The species is endemic to Madagascar where it occurs in the southeast.

The species has two varieties:

- Aloe versicolor var. steffaniana (Rauh) J.-B.Castillon & J.-P.Castillon
- Aloe versicolor var. versicolor
