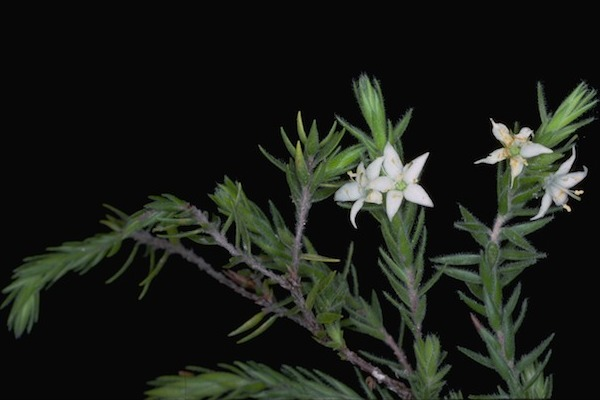

Conservation status
- Vulnerable (EPBC Act)

Scientific classification
- Kingdom: Plantae
- Clade: Tracheophytes
- Clade: Angiosperms
- Clade: Eudicots
- Clade: Asterids
- Order: Ericales
- Family: Ericaceae
- Genus: Epacris
- Species: E. gnidioides

Binomial name
- Epacris gnidioides (Summerh.) E.A.Br.

Synonyms
- Rupicola gnidioides Summerh.; Budawangia gnidioides (Summerh.) I.Telford

= Epacris gnidioides =

Species of flowering plants

Epacris gnidioides, commonly known as Budawangs cliff-heath, is a species of flowering plant in the heath family Ericaceae and is endemic to a restricted area of New South Wales. It is a small, creeping shrub with hairy branches, sharply-pointed lance-shaped leaves, and tube-shaped, white flowers. Originally described as Rupicola gnidioides, it was at one time regarded as the only species in the genus Budawangia under the synonym Budawangia gnidioides.

== Description ==
Epacris gnidioides is a creeping, rhizome-forming shrub with branches up to 50 cm (20 in) long. Its leaves are lance-shaped, 4–8 mm (0.16–0.31 in) long and 1–2 mm (0.039–0.079 in) wide on a petiole about 1.5 mm (0.059 in) long. The leaves are thin, concave and covered with long, soft hairs. The flowers are arranged singly in leaf axils on a pedicel 1.5–5 mm (0.059–0.197 in) long, the sepals 2.5–3.0 mm (0.098–0.118 in) long. The petals are white and form a tube 1.0–1.2 mm (0.039–0.047 in) long, the lobes 3.0–3.5 mm (0.12–0.14 in) long and tapered. Flowering occurs from September to February and the fruit is a capsule about 2 mm (0.079 in) long.

== Taxonomy ==
This species was first formally described in 1927 by Victor Samuel Summerhayes who gave it the name Rupicola gnidioides in the Bulletin of Miscellaneous Information based on specimens collected in 1927 by Frederick A. Rodway near the Ettrema River, south west of Nowra in a "cleft in sandstone cliff".

In 1992, Ian Telford moved the species to his newly created genus Budawangia as Budawangia gnidioides in the journal Telopea. It was the only species in the genus.

In 2015, Elizabeth Anne Brown transferred the species to Epacris as Epacris gnidioides based on a phylogenetic study which found that Rupicola and Budawangia were embedded within Epacris. As of March 2024, sources such as the Australian Plant Census and Plants of the World Online accept the name Epacris gnidioides, regarding Rupicola gnidioides and Budawangia gnidioides as a synonyms.

== Distribution and habitat ==
Budawangs cliff-heath grows in rock crevices and on sandy ledges at the base of sandstone cliffs on the edges of forest and heath and is only known from the northern Budawang Range in south-eastern New South Wales.

== Conservation status ==
Epacris gnidioides is listed as "vulnerable" under the Australian Government Environment Protection and Biodiversity Conservation Act 1999 (EPBC) Act and the New South Wales Biodiversity Conservation Act 2016. The main threats to its survival are its narrow distribution, inappropriate fire regimes, and use of sandstone caves for camping.
