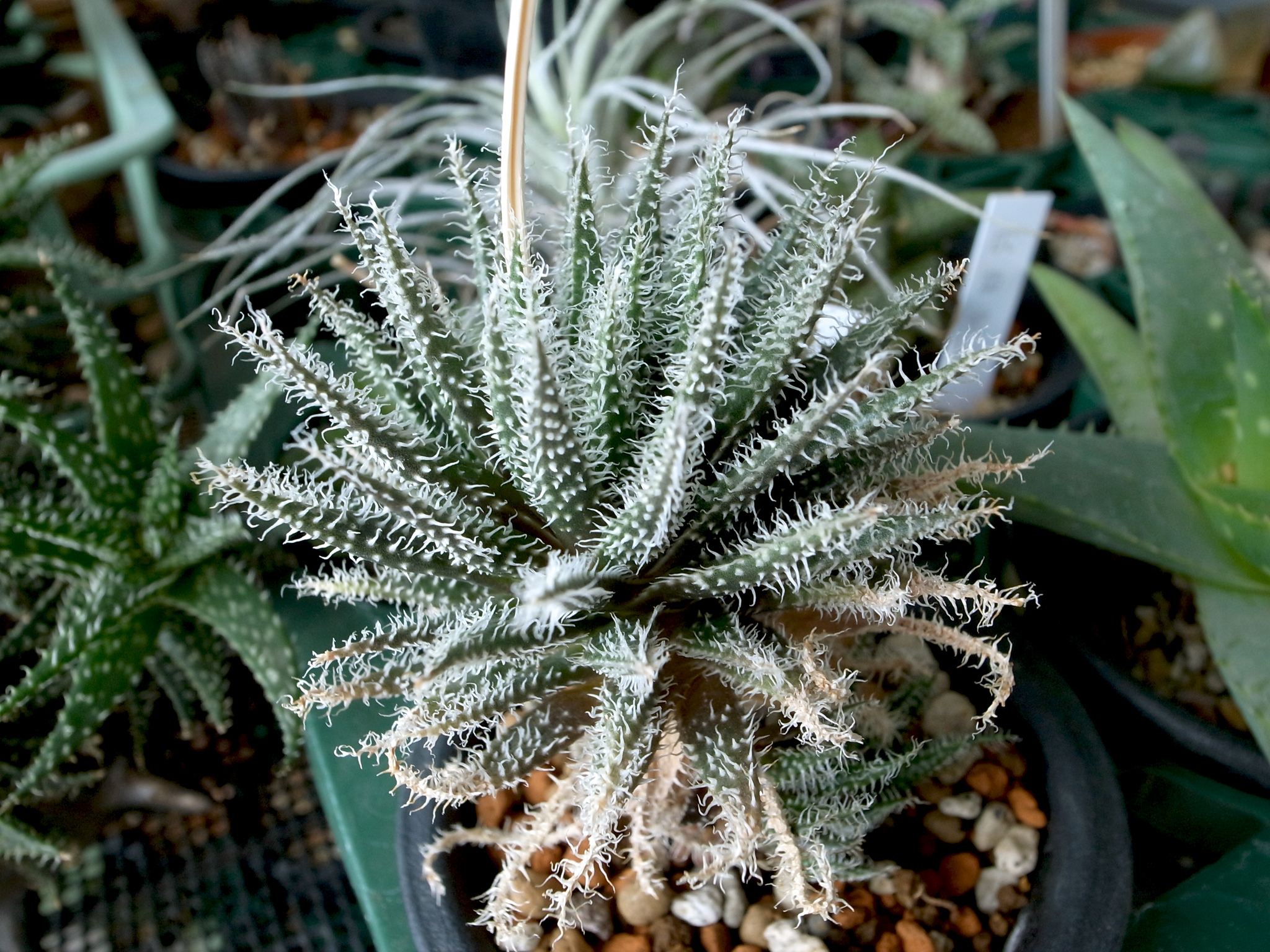
- A single A. haworthioides

Conservation status
- CITES Appendix I (CITES)

Scientific classification
- Kingdom: Plantae
- Clade: Tracheophytes
- Clade: Angiosperms
- Clade: Monocots
- Order: Asparagales
- Family: Asphodelaceae
- Subfamily: Asphodeloideae
- Genus: Aloe
- Species: A. haworthioides

Binomial name
- Aloe haworthioides Baker

Synonyms
- Aloinella haworthioides (Baker) Lemée; Lemeea haworthioides (Baker) P.V.Heath

= Aloe haworthioides =

Species of succulent

Aloe haworthioides is a species of plant in the genus Aloe native to Madagascar. This aloe is named for its leaves, which are covered with soft spines that create a resemblance to Haworthia species. A small species, it grows in stemless, clumping offsets and sports orange, highly fragrant flowers.
