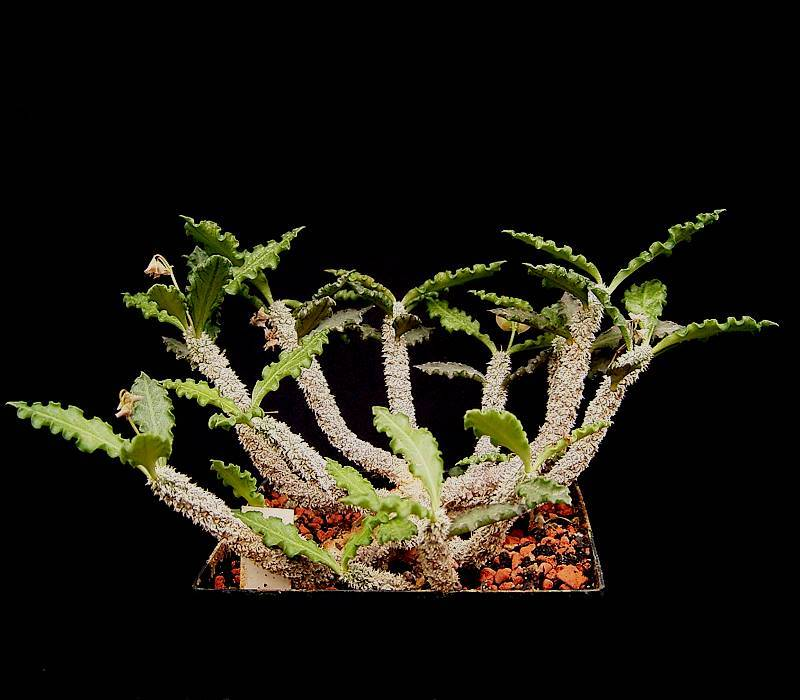

Conservation status
- Vulnerable (IUCN 3.1)
- CITES Appendix I (CITES)

Scientific classification
- Kingdom: Plantae
- Clade: Tracheophytes
- Clade: Angiosperms
- Clade: Eudicots
- Clade: Rosids
- Order: Malpighiales
- Family: Euphorbiaceae
- Genus: Euphorbia
- Species: E. ambovombensis

Binomial name
- Euphorbia ambovombensis Rauh & Razaf.

= Euphorbia ambovombensis =

Species of flowering plant

Euphorbia ambovombensis is a species of plant in the family Euphorbiaceae. It is endemic to Madagascar. It is native to the area around Ambovombe at the southern end of the island, where it is locally common. Its natural habitats are subtropical or tropical dry forests and subtropical or tropical dry shrubland. It is threatened by habitat loss.

Trade in this species is regulated under Appendix I of CITES.
