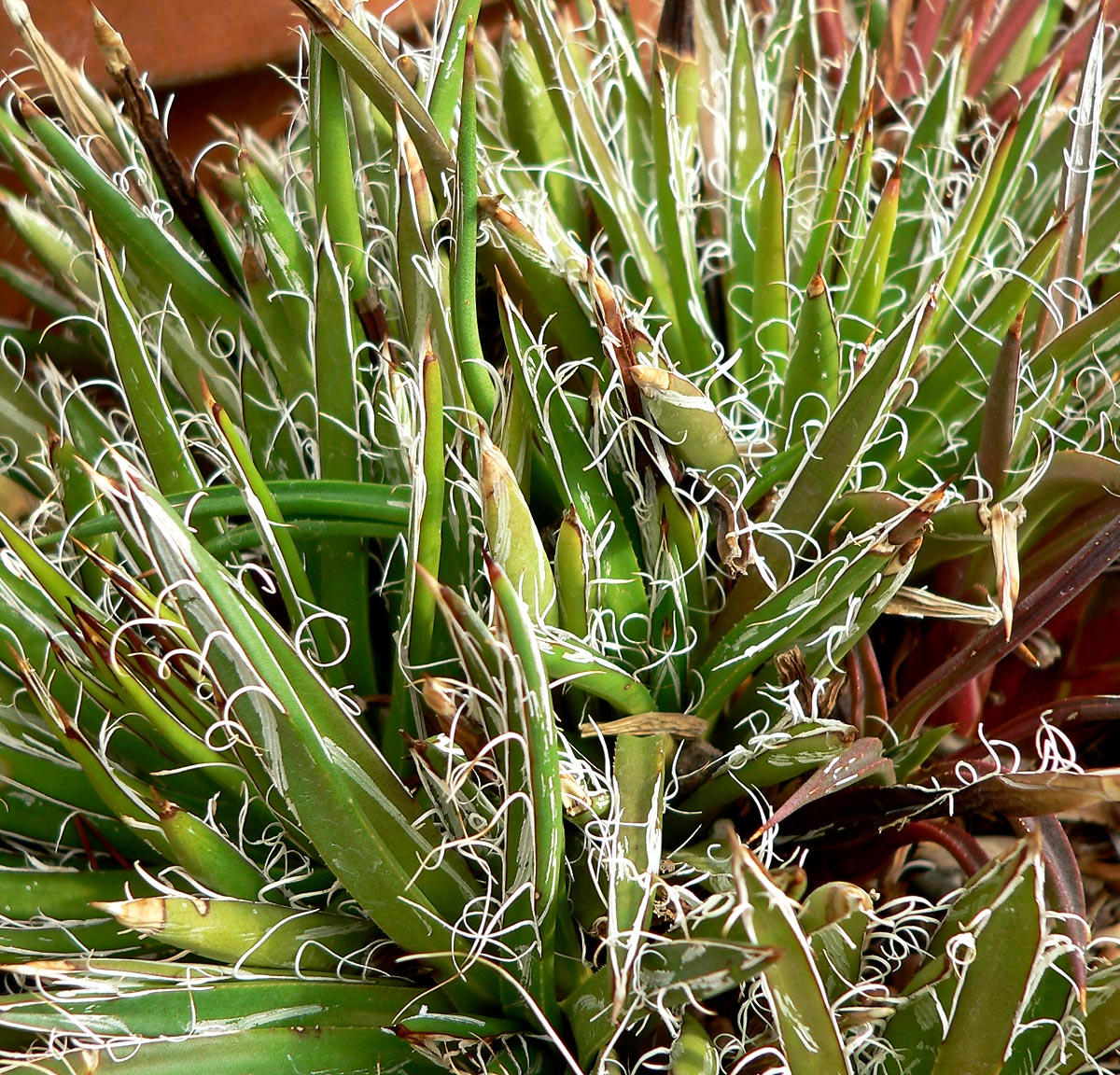

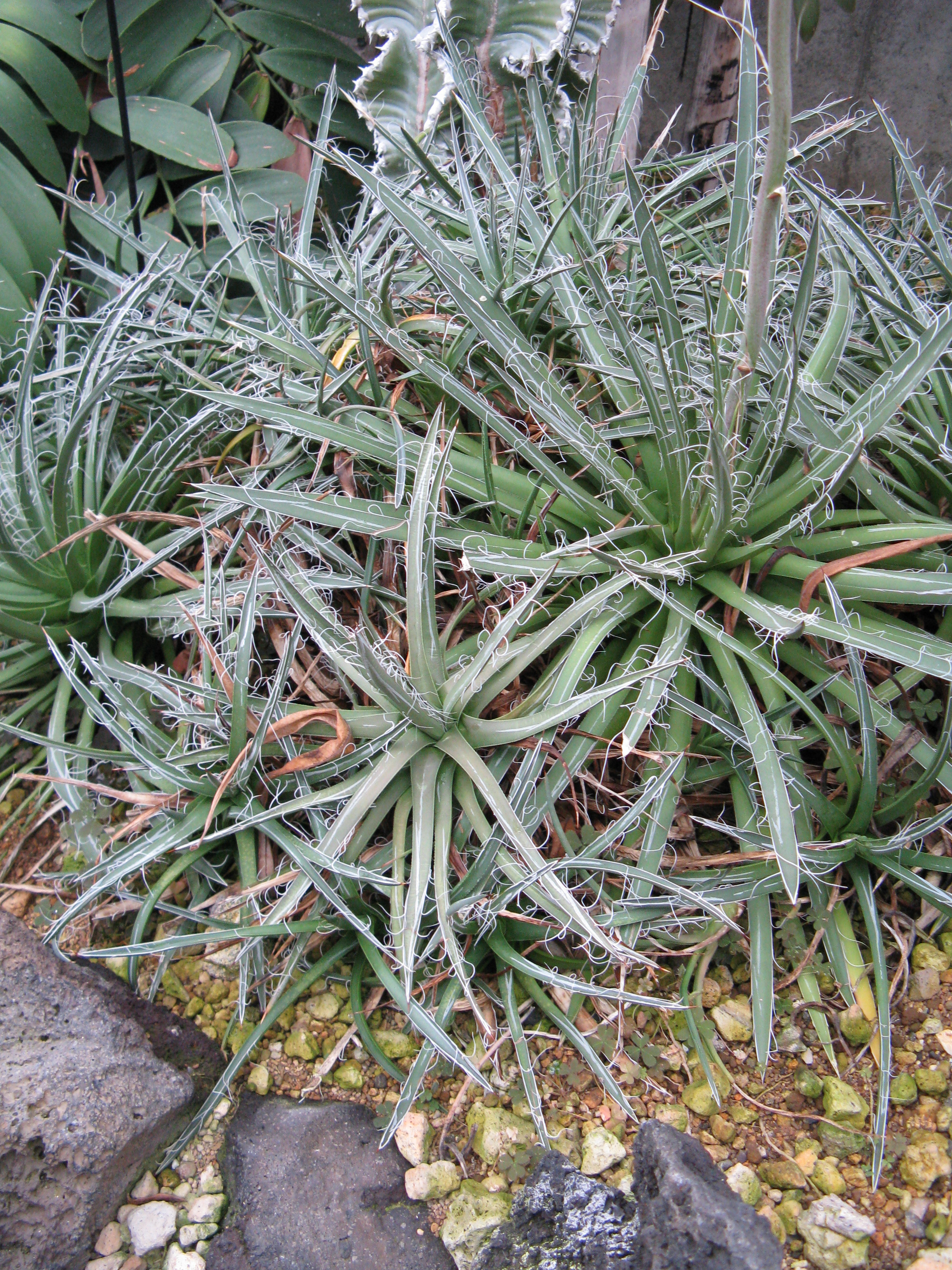

Conservation status
- Least Concern (IUCN 3.1)

- Vulnerable (NatureServe)

Scientific classification
- Kingdom: Plantae
- Clade: Tracheophytes
- Clade: Angiosperms
- Clade: Monocots
- Order: Asparagales
- Family: Asparagaceae
- Subfamily: Agavoideae
- Genus: Agave
- Species: A. parviflora

Binomial name
- Agave parviflora Torr.

= Agave parviflora =

Species of flowering plant

Agave parviflora is a species of succulent perennial flowering plant in the asparagus family, known by the common names Santa Cruz striped agave, smallflower century plant, and small-flower agave. It is native to Arizona in the United States and Sonora in Mexico.

== Description ==
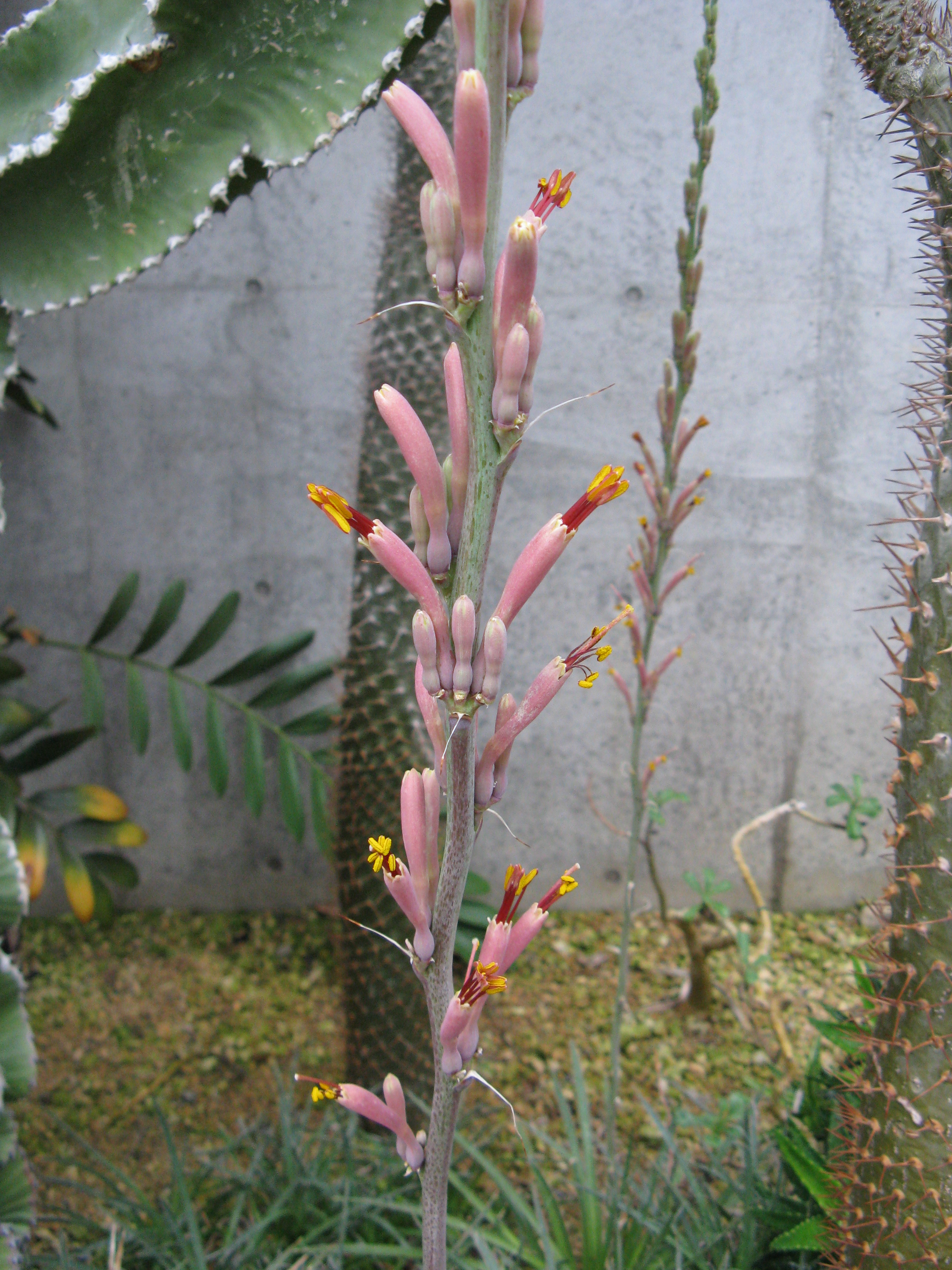
Osaka Prefectural Flower Garden, Osaka, Japan

The specific epithet parviflora means "small-flowered".

Agave parviflora produces a small rosette, measuring up to 25 cm (10 in) tall by 20 cm (8 in) wide. The spine-tipped succulent leaves are up to 20 cm (8 in) long and a waxy, dark-green hue, with white markings. The leaf margins have hair-like, naturally "peeling" threads (part of the leaves), similar to species such as A. filifera. After several years, the plant produces an inflorescence around 1–2 m (3–7 ft) tall with cream or pale yellow flowers in summer. The flowers are pollinated by bees such as bumblebees, and are also popular amongst hummingbirds when fully opened. In full bloom, other pollinating birds (such as sunbirds) and butterflies also are attracted by this agave.

Agave parviflora can grow for between 10 and 15 years prior to ever flowering. When it flowers, it sends a roughly 7 foot (2.13 m) high, asparagus-resembling stalk into the sky, with light yellow or cream-colored flowers. Prior to the flowers having opened, fresh Agave inflorescences bear an appearance not unlike that of an edible asparagus (albeit oversized), showing the close relation between the two genera and the placement of Agave within the Asparagaceae family. The flowers come in groups of 1–4 flowers, mostly in spring. After blooming, the agave dies. The fruit are small, ovoid capsules, between 6 and 10 millimeters in diameter; seeds are wedge-shaped and half-round. The plant has slow to moderate growth, as does most of its genus. The leaves are strongly whorled and grow tightly around ramets, and are also narrow and stiff, tapering to a sharp point. The texture of the plant is medium coarse. If the roots are chronically damp, A. parviflora might develop black root rot (Thielaviopsis basicola). Root rot can spread and cause a health plant to turn to "mush". Additionally, like all agaves, and some other asparagales, the agave snout weevil (Scyphophorus acupunctatus) can be a problem if not detected and eradicated early-on; this small black beetle, with its distinctive long "snout" appendage, lays it eggs in the core of the agave plant, often one that has developed some amount of root rot or is receiving excessive irrigation. The eggs then hatch and the maggots consume the agave itself, killing it. Extra amended drainage material (pumice, perlite, sand) is vital in their substrate, as well as proper airflow and growing out-of-doors, where (and when) appropriate; less organic matter, and more inert, rocky material, is best for cultivating healthy agave plants.

Subspecies of the plant include ssp. parviflora and ssp. densiflora.

== Distribution and habitat ==
It grows in semi-desert grasslands, oak woodlands, and other dry and rocky places. It is a rare species that has limited distribution in Arizona and parts of Northern Mexico. The state of Arizona considers Agave parviflora as endangered and protects it as highly safeguarded. The US Forest Service designated it as a Sensitive Species. Since this species is federally endangered, it is illegal to collect this plant. It commonly grows at elevations between 3,000 and 5,000 feet (900 and 1,520 m).

== Cultivation ==
This species is the smallest agave in Arizona and is sought by collectors. For this reason the species has declined in its native habitat. There are only about two dozen natural populations in Arizona. Other threats to the species include road construction and mining. However, because the population appears to be stable and it grows in several protected areas, it is not considered by the IUCN to be threatened.

The plant is valued in cultivation and has gained the Royal Horticultural Society's Award of Garden Merit.

== Uses ==
The leaves and the heart of the plant are baked and eaten. This species is the sweetest and most edible of Agave. However, it is commonly not eaten as it is also the smallest of its genus. It is used to make the distilled liquor Mezcal. Mezcal can be made out of any Agave species, although around 7 species are the most common and favorited.
