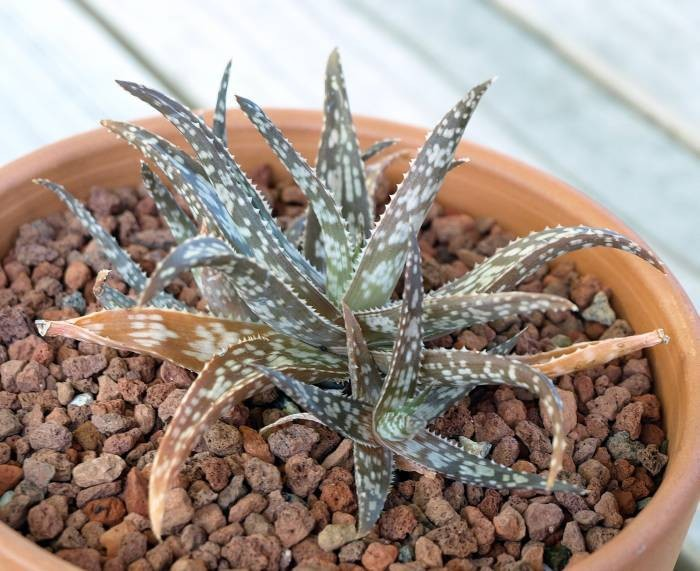

Conservation status
- CITES Appendix I (CITES)

Scientific classification
- Kingdom: Plantae
- Clade: Tracheophytes
- Clade: Angiosperms
- Clade: Monocots
- Order: Asparagales
- Family: Asphodelaceae
- Subfamily: Asphodeloideae
- Genus: Aloe
- Species: A. rauhii

Binomial name
- Aloe rauhii Reynolds

Synonyms
- Guillauminia rauhii (Reynolds) P.V.Heath

= Aloe rauhii =

Species of succulent

Aloe rauhii (common name snowflake aloe) is a rare succulent and highly drought-resistant plant endemic to Madagascar. It is named after Professor Werner Rauh, who was a professor of Botany at the University of Heidelberg in Germany.

== Description ==
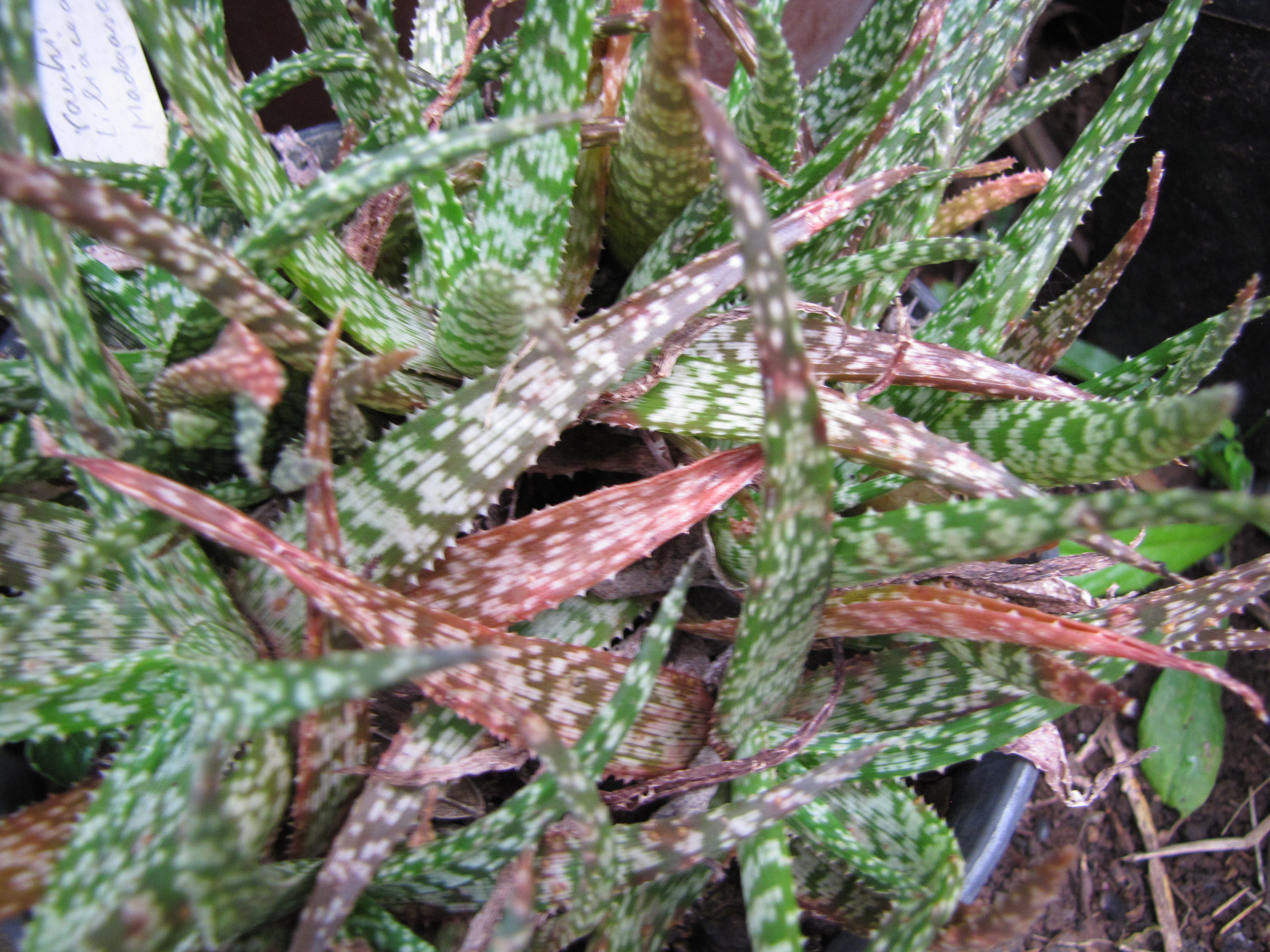
Growing in clumps

Aloe rauhii is less than 6 inches (15 cm) high, where it grows without a stem or with a very short stem, branches and then forms dense groups. The up to 20 lanceolate-deltoid leaves form dense rosettes, which are approximately 5 inches (12 cm) in diameter. The grey-green, occasionally brownish leaf blade is 7 to 10 centimetres long and 1.5 to 2 centimetres wide. The leaves have characteristic heavily white oval spots with tiny white marginal teeth, the overall appearance of which may resemble snowflakes. The leaf tip is pointed. The white teeth on the cartilaginous, white leaf edge are about 0.5 millimetres long and are 1 to 2 millimetres apart. Plant propagates via clumping. In full sunlight, the green and white leaves become a purplish orange color.

=== Inflorescences ===
The simple or rarely branched inflorescence reaches a length of 30 centimeters. The loose, cylindrical and slightly tapered racemes are about 7 centimeters long and 4 centimeters wide. They consist of twelve to 18 flowers. The egg-shaped, pointed, narrowed, white bracts are 4 to 5 millimeters long and 2 millimeters wide. The pink-scarlet flowers are lighter at their opening. They stand on 10 millimeter long flower stalks. The flowers are 25 millimeters long and shortly narrowed at the base. At the level of the ovary, the flowers have a diameter of 5 millimeters. Above this, they are slightly narrowed and then widen towards the opening. Their tepals are not fused together. The stamens and style protrude up to 1 millimeter from the flower.

== Conservation status ==
Madagascar is recognized as one of the most ecologically rich countries in the world, and over 80% of its flora is endemic. However, the diverse plant life is under threat and some species are on the verge of extinction. The flora of Madagascar is unique due to the island's separation from the African continent over 160 million years ago, a possible explanation for A. rauhii being an endemic species.

== Distribution ==
Aloe rauhii is widespread in Madagascar on sandstone cliffs in dense bush at altitudes of about 600 meters.
