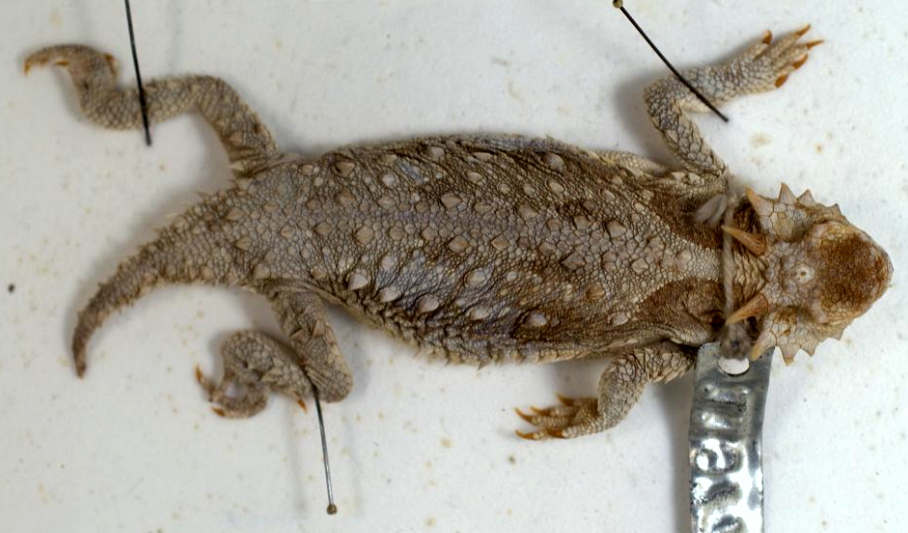
- Holotype at the Smithsonian Institution
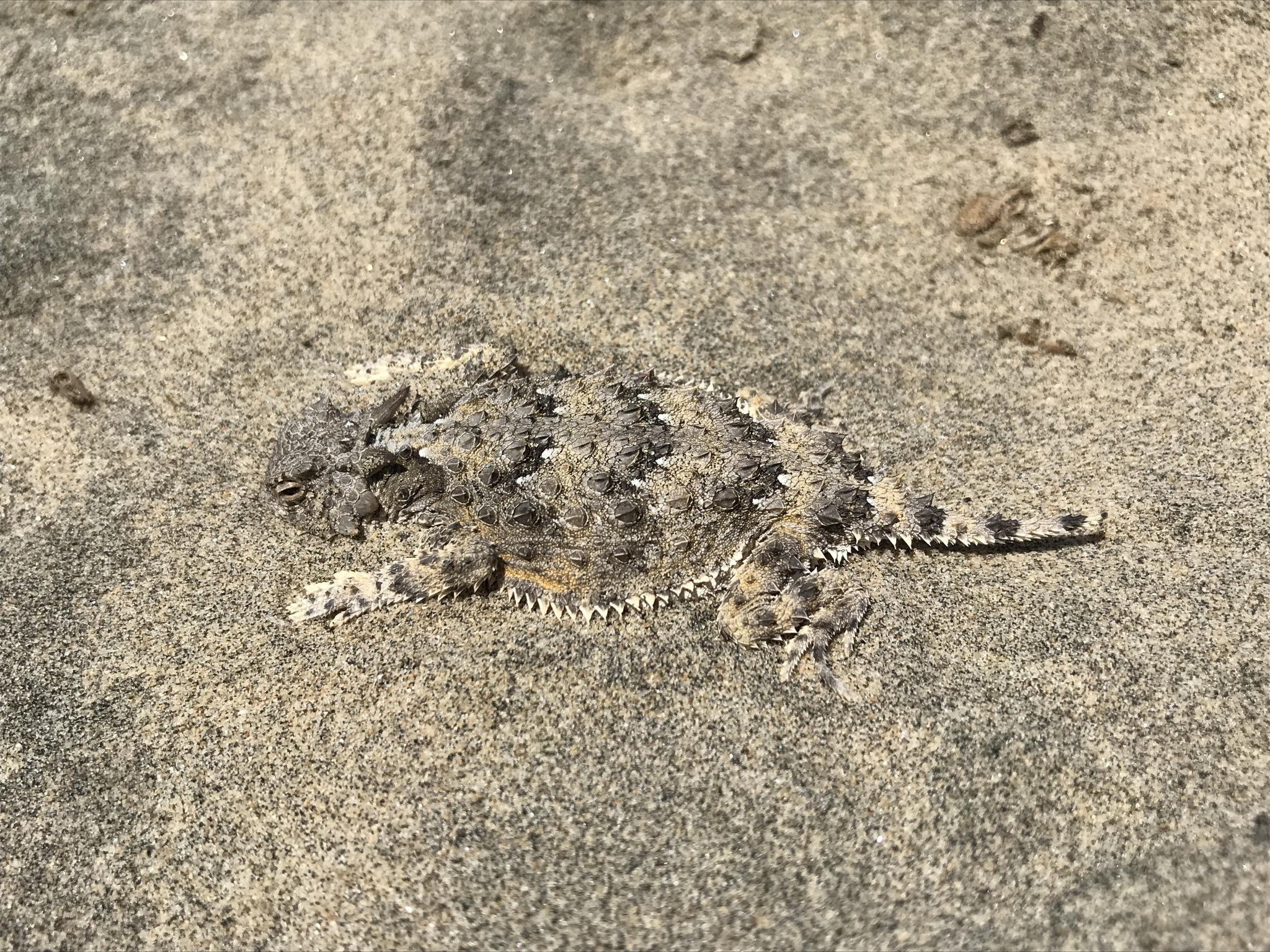

Scientific classification
- Kingdom: Animalia
- Phylum: Chordata
- Class: Reptilia
- Order: Squamata
- Suborder: Iguania
- Family: Phrynosomatidae
- Genus: Phrynosoma
- Species: P. cerroense

Binomial name
- Phrynosoma cerroense Stejneger, 1893

= Cedros Island horned lizard =

Species of lizard

The Cedros Island horned lizard (Phrynosoma cerroense) is a horned lizard species native to Cedros Island in Mexico.
