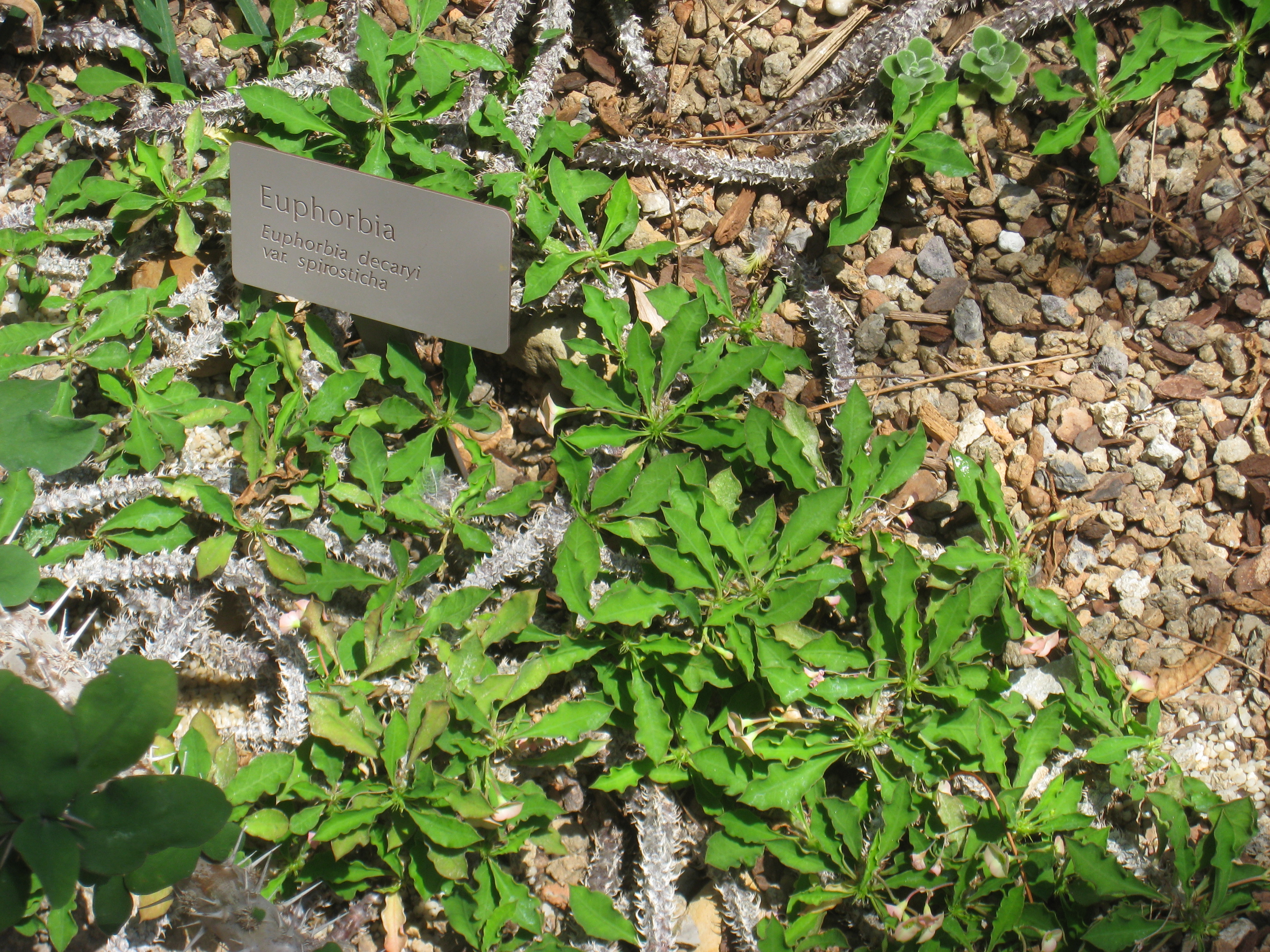

Conservation status
- Endangered (IUCN 3.1)
- CITES Appendix I

Scientific classification
- Kingdom: Plantae
- Clade: Embryophytes
- Clade: Tracheophytes
- Clade: Spermatophytes
- Clade: Angiosperms
- Clade: Eudicots
- Clade: Rosids
- Order: Malpighiales
- Family: Euphorbiaceae
- Genus: Euphorbia
- Species: E. decaryi

Binomial name
- Euphorbia decaryi Guillaumin

Varieties
- E. d. var. decaryi; E. d. var. robinsonii

Synonyms
- Euphorbia francoisii

= Euphorbia decaryi =

Plant species in the spurge family

Euphorbia decaryi is a species of plant in the family Euphorbiaceae endemic to Madagascar. Its natural habitats are subtropical or tropical dry forests, subtropical or tropical dry shrubland, and rocky areas. It is threatened by habitat loss.

Euphorbia decaryi is a spreading, evergreen plant, under 6" in height, and blooming April–June. Flowers are chartreuse, yellow-green, yellow, or red; female flowers carry a three-part pistil over a three-part ovary, producing three or sometimes more seeds.

== Taxonomy ==
Euphorbia decaryi was scientifically described and named in 1934 by André Guillaumin. It is classified in the genus Euphorbia within the Euphorbiaceae family with two accepted varieties.

- Euphorbia decaryi var. decaryi
- Euphorbia decaryi var. robinsonii

Variety decaryi has two heterotypic synonyms. Euphorbia francoisii described by Jacques Désiré Leandri in 1946 and a form named rubrifolia described by Werner Rauh in 1996.
