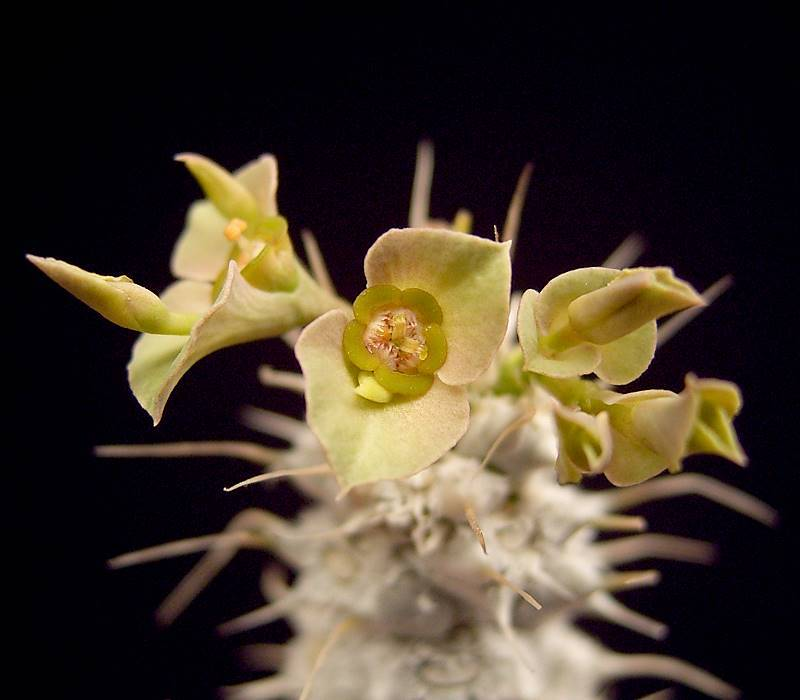

Conservation status
- Critically Endangered (IUCN 3.1)
- CITES Appendix I

Scientific classification
- Kingdom: Plantae
- Clade: Tracheophytes
- Clade: Angiosperms
- Clade: Eudicots
- Clade: Rosids
- Order: Malpighiales
- Family: Euphorbiaceae
- Genus: Euphorbia
- Species: E. parvicyathophora

Binomial name
- Euphorbia parvicyathophora Rauh

= Euphorbia parvicyathophora =

Species of flowering plant

Euphorbia parvicyathophora is a species of flowering plant in the family Euphorbiaceae. It is endemic to South-West Madagascar. It typically lives in rocky environments; particularly, limestone is its primary locale of habitation. It grows within the soil pockets of cavernous limestone along the southern bank of the Fiherenana river, in southern Madagascar. This species is threatened by habitat loss.
