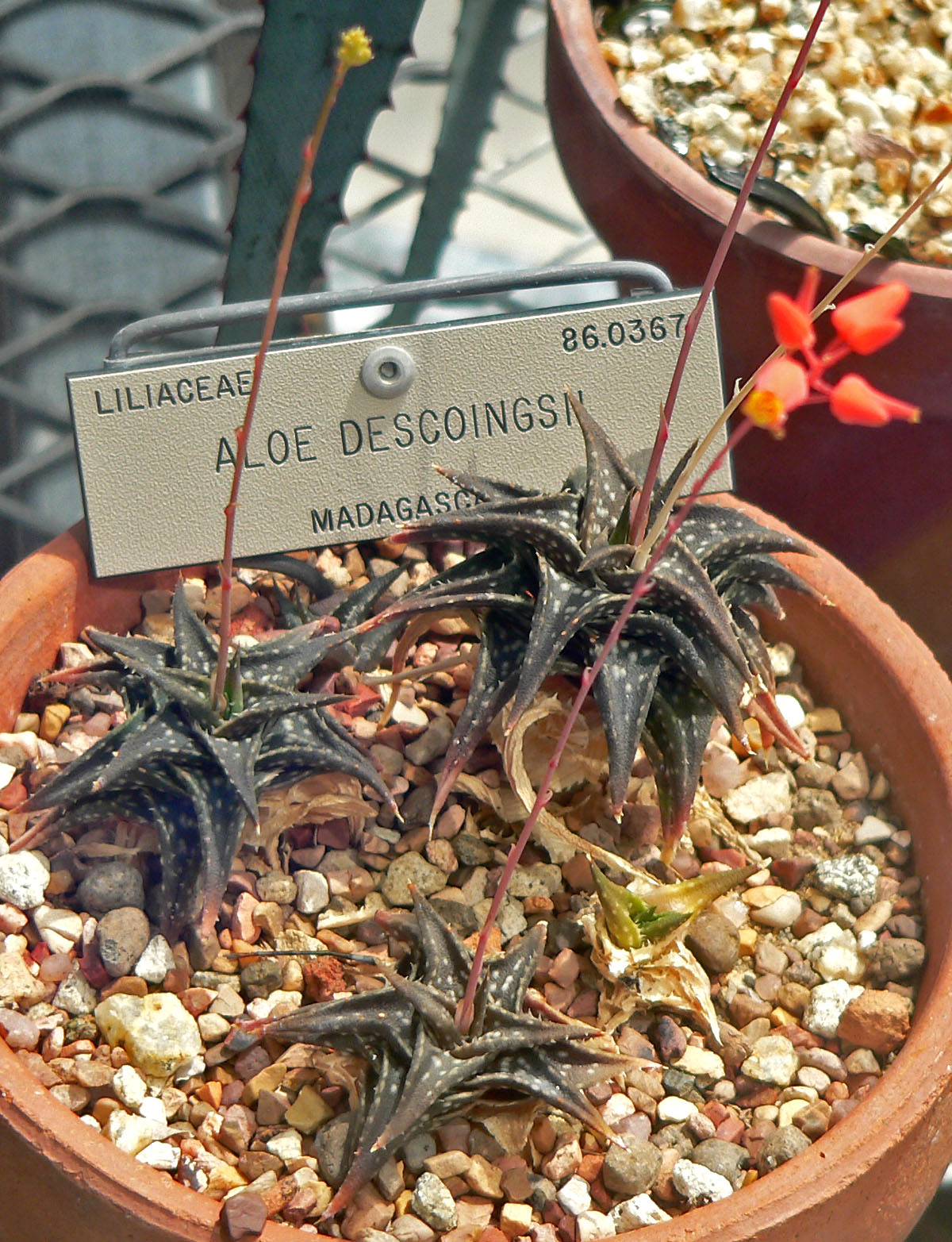
- Aloe descoingsii at the University of California Botanical Garden in Berkeley, CA

Conservation status
- Endangered (IUCN 3.1)
- CITES Appendix I

Scientific classification
- Kingdom: Plantae
- Clade: Tracheophytes
- Clade: Angiosperms
- Clade: Monocots
- Order: Asparagales
- Family: Asphodelaceae
- Subfamily: Asphodeloideae
- Genus: Aloe
- Species: A. descoingsii

Binomial name
- Aloe descoingsii Reynolds

Subspecies
- Aloe descoingsii subsp. augustina Lavranos; Aloe descoingsii subsp. descoingsii

Synonyms
- Guillauminia descoingsii (Reynolds) P.V.Heath

= Aloe descoingsii =

Species of succulent

Aloe descoingsii is a species of Aloe native to southern Madagascar. Regarded as the smallest Aloe species in the world, it generally reaches a maximum of about 3 inches (7.62 cm) across.
