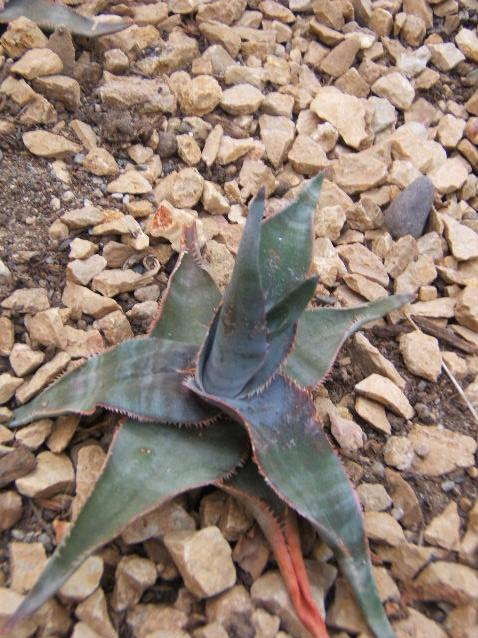

Conservation status
- Endangered (IUCN 2.3)

Scientific classification
- Kingdom: Plantae
- Clade: Tracheophytes
- Clade: Angiosperms
- Clade: Monocots
- Order: Asparagales
- Family: Asphodelaceae
- Subfamily: Asphodeloideae
- Genus: Aloe
- Species: A. laeta

Binomial name
- Aloe laeta A.Berger

Synonyms
- Aloe laeta var. typica H.Perrier

= Aloe laeta =

Species of succulent

Aloe laeta is an aloe that is part of the Asphodelaceae family. The species is endemic to Madagascar.

There are also two varieties:

- Aloe laeta var. laeta
- Aloe laeta var. maniaensis H.Perrier
