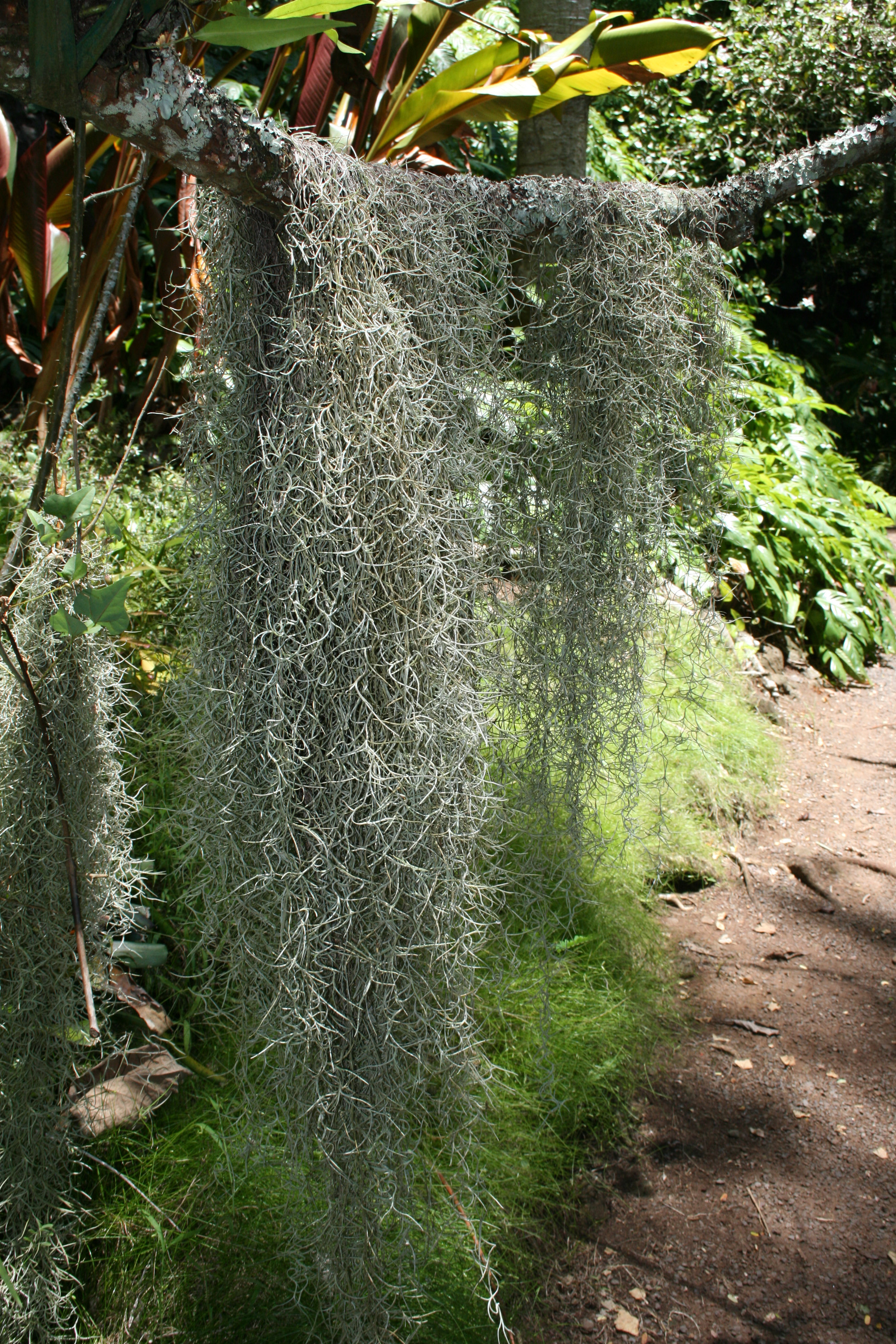

Conservation status
- Least Concern (IUCN 3.1)

Scientific classification
- Kingdom: Plantae
- Clade: Tracheophytes
- Clade: Angiosperms
- Clade: Monocots
- Clade: Commelinids
- Order: Poales
- Family: Bromeliaceae
- Genus: Tillandsia
- Subgenus: Tillandsia subg. Diaphoranthema
- Species: T. usneoides

Binomial name
- Tillandsia usneoides (L.) L., 1762

Synonyms
- Renealmia usneoides L.; Dendropogon usneoides (L.) Raf.; Strepsia usneoides (L.) Nutt. ex Steud.; Tillandsia trichoides Kunth; Tillandsia filiformis Lodd. ex Schult. & Schult.f.; Tillandsia crinita Willd. ex Beer

= Spanish moss =

Species of plant, Tillandsia usneoides

Spanish moss (Tillandsia usneoides) is an epiphytic flowering plant that often grows upon large trees in tropical and subtropical climates. It is native to much of Mexico, Bermuda, the Bahamas, Central America, South America (as far south as northern Patagonia), the Southern United States, and West Indies. It has been naturalized in Queensland (Australia). It is colloquially known as "old man's beard" in several places, and known as "grandpa's beard" in French Polynesia. It has the widest distribution of any bromeliad.

Most known in the United States, it commonly is found on the southern live oak (Quercus virginiana) and bald cypress (Taxodium distichum) in the lowlands, swamps, and marshes of the mid-Atlantic and Southeastern states, from the coast of southeastern Virginia to Florida and west to southern Arkansas and Texas. While it superficially resembles its namesake, the lichen Usnea, it is neither a lichen nor a moss (instead being a member of the bromeliad family, Bromeliaceae), and it is not native to Spain.

Southern live oak trees draped with Spanish moss, St. Augustine, Florida

== Description ==
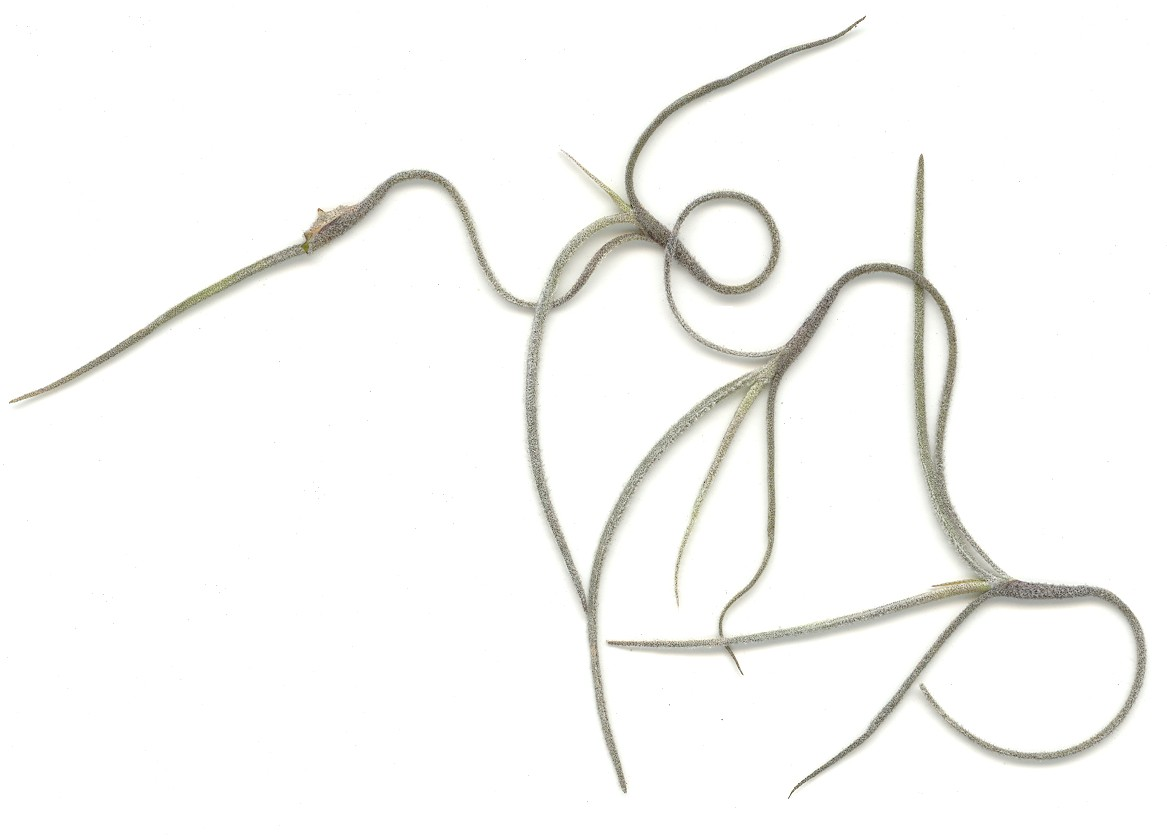
Close-up of Spanish moss

Spanish moss consists of one or more slender stems, bearing alternate thin, curved or curly, and heavily scaled leaves 2–6 cm (0.8–2.4 inches) long and 1 mm (0.04 inches) broad, that grow vegetatively in a chain-like fashion (pendant), forming hanging structures of up to 6 m (20 feet). The gray-green garlands have occasionally been found hanging down as much as 8 m (26 ft).

The plant has no roots. Its flowers are red-pink and small, with spreading petals. The scape is partly hidden within the leaf sheath. Spanish moss propagates both by seed and vegetatively by fragments that are carried on the wind and stick to tree limbs or that are carried to other locations by birds as nesting material.

== Taxonomy ==
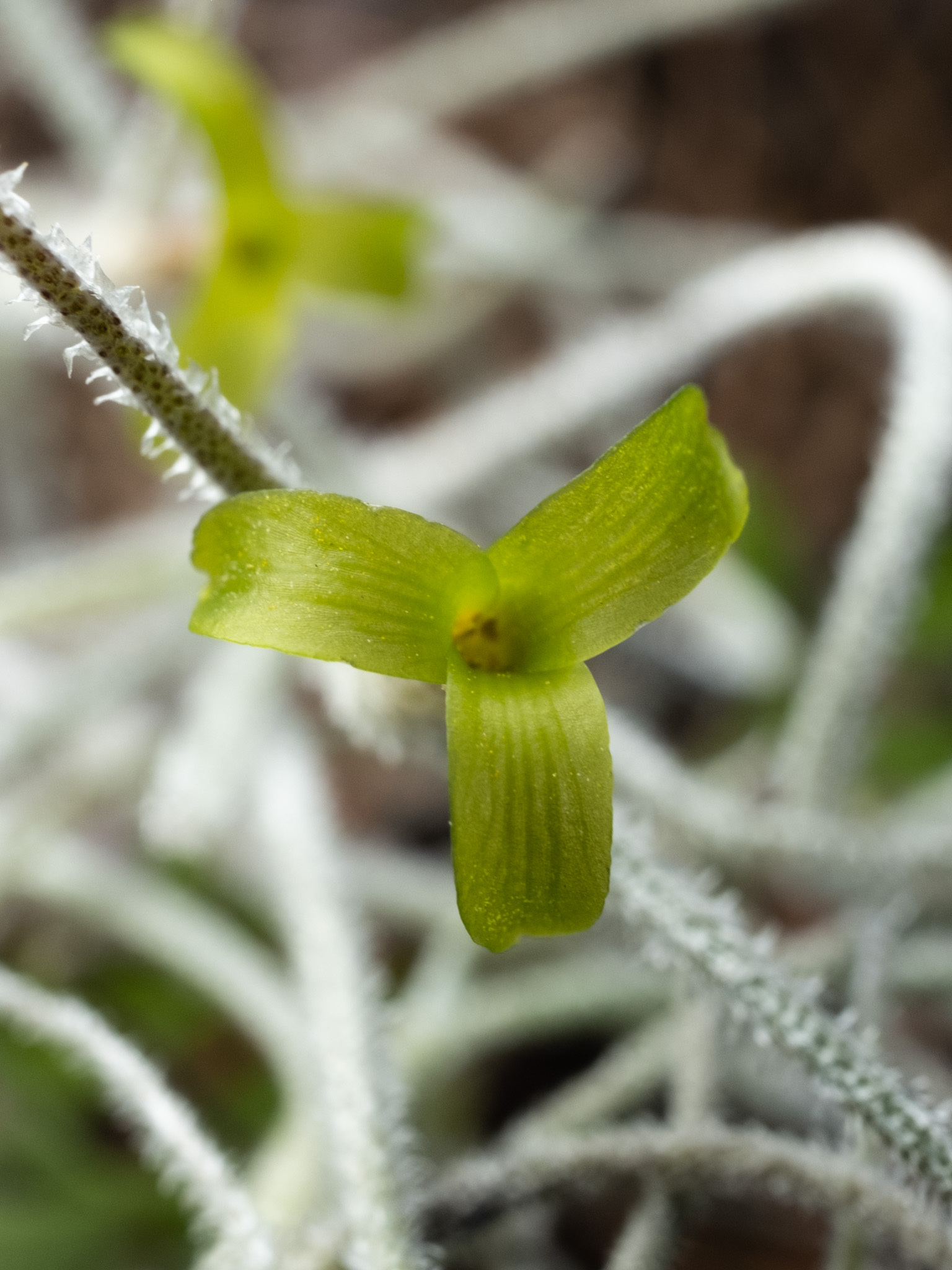
Spanish moss flower

Spanish moss is in the family Bromeliaceae (the bromeliads). Formerly, it was placed in the genera Anoplophytum, Caraguata, and Renealmia. The specific name of the plant, usneoides, means "resembling Usnea", a lichen.

== Habitat and distribution ==
Spanish moss's primary range is in the Southeastern United States (including Puerto Rico and the U.S. Virgin Islands) to Argentina, where the climate is warm enough and a relatively high average humidity occurs. In North America, it occurs in a broad band following the Gulf of Mexico and the southern Atlantic coast. The northern limit of its natural range is Northampton County, Virginia, with colonial-era reports of it in southern Maryland, where no populations are now known to exist.

It has been introduced to locations around the world with similar conditions, including Hawaii, where it first established itself in the nineteenth century.

== Ecology ==
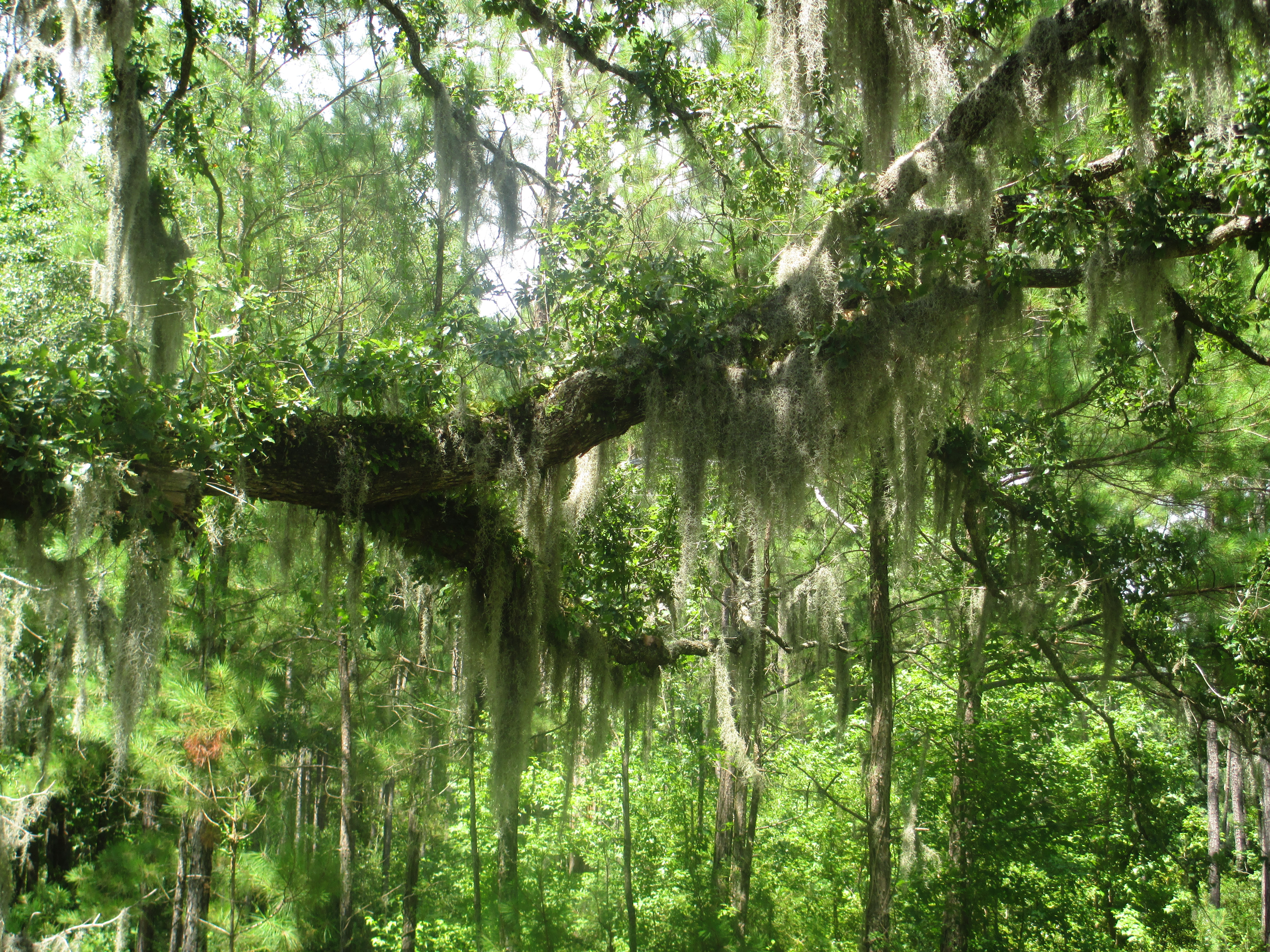
Spanish moss growing along the limb of a tree

Spanish moss is not parasitic: it is an epiphyte that absorbs nutrients and water through its own leaves from the air and rain falling upon it. While its presence rarely kills the trees on which it grows, it occasionally becomes so thick that, by shading the leaves of the tree, it slows the growth rate of the tree. Different species of plant seem to vary in their tolerance to Spanish moss, and it has become a problematic weed in some places it has been introduced, such as Northern Sydney, Australia, where it is a threat to the Sydney Turpentine Ironbark Forest, Blue Gum High Forest and rainforests of the area.

Spanish moss can use the water-conserving strategy of crassulacean acid metabolism for photosynthesis.

In the southern U.S., the plant seems to show preferences for southern live oak (Quercus virginiana) and bald cypress (Taxodium distichum) because of their high rates of foliar mineral leaching (calcium, magnesium, potassium, and phosphorus) that provides an abundant supply of nutrients to the epiphytic plant. It can also colonize other tree species such as sweetgum (Liquidambar styraciflua), crepe-myrtles (Lagerstroemia spp.), other oaks, and even pines. It also grows more uncommonly on artificial structures such as fencing and telephone lines.

Spanish moss shelters a number of creatures, including rat snakes and three species of bats. One species of jumping spider, Pelegrina tillandsiae, has been found only on Spanish moss. Although widely presumed to infest Spanish moss, in one study of the ecology of the plant, chiggers were not present among thousands of other arthropods identified on the plant.

Spanish moss is sensitive to airborne contaminants. It does not grow in areas where smoke is common, such as near chimneys. It has receded from urban areas due to increasing air pollution.

== Culture and folklore ==
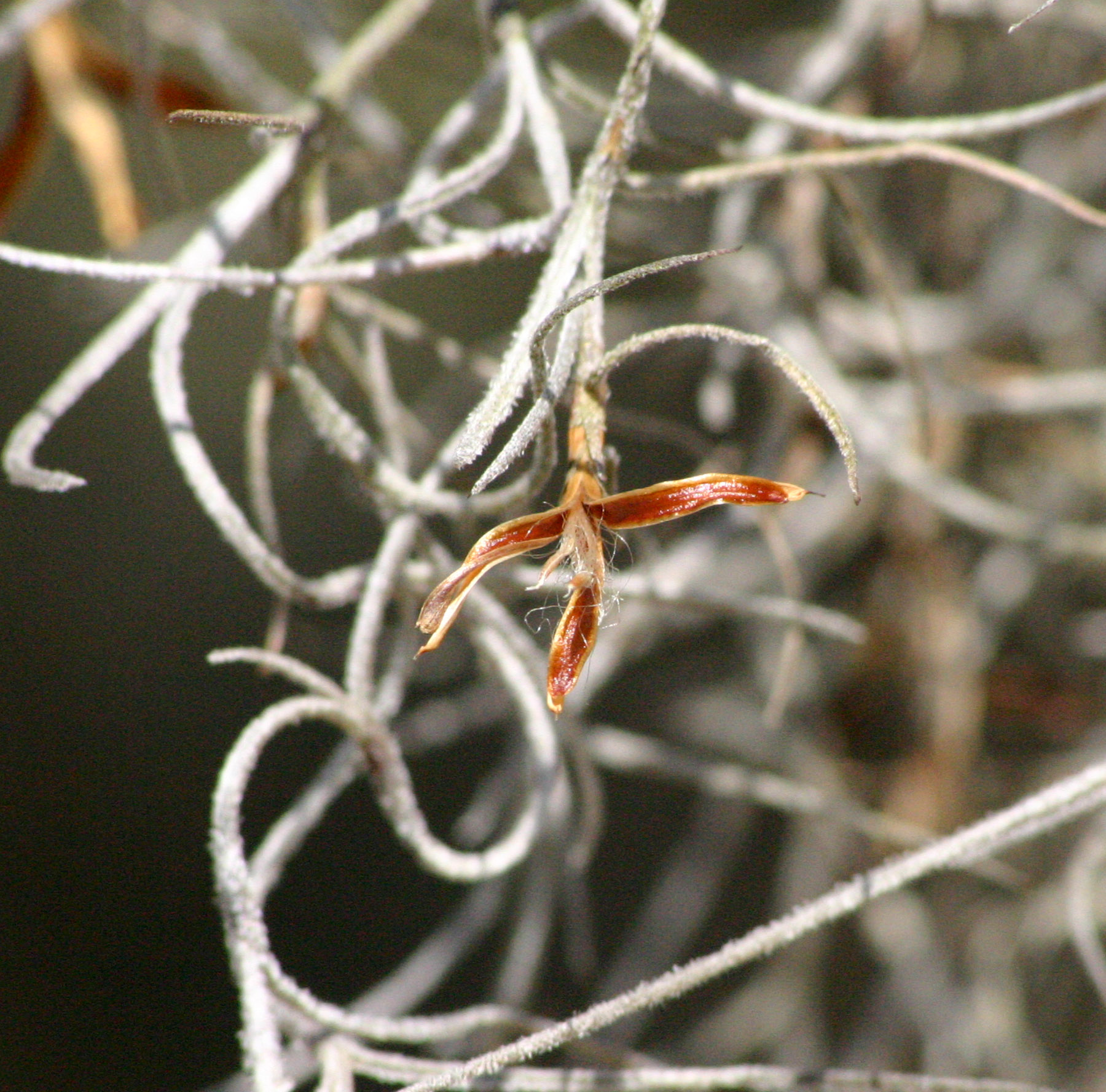
Spanish moss with open seed capsule in Santee National Wildlife Refuge, South Carolina

Spanish moss is often associated with Southern Gothic imagery and Deep South culture, due to its propensity for growing in subtropical humid southern locales such as Alabama, Southern Arkansas, Florida, Georgia, Louisiana, Mississippi, North Carolina, South Carolina, east and south Texas, and extreme south eastern Virginia.

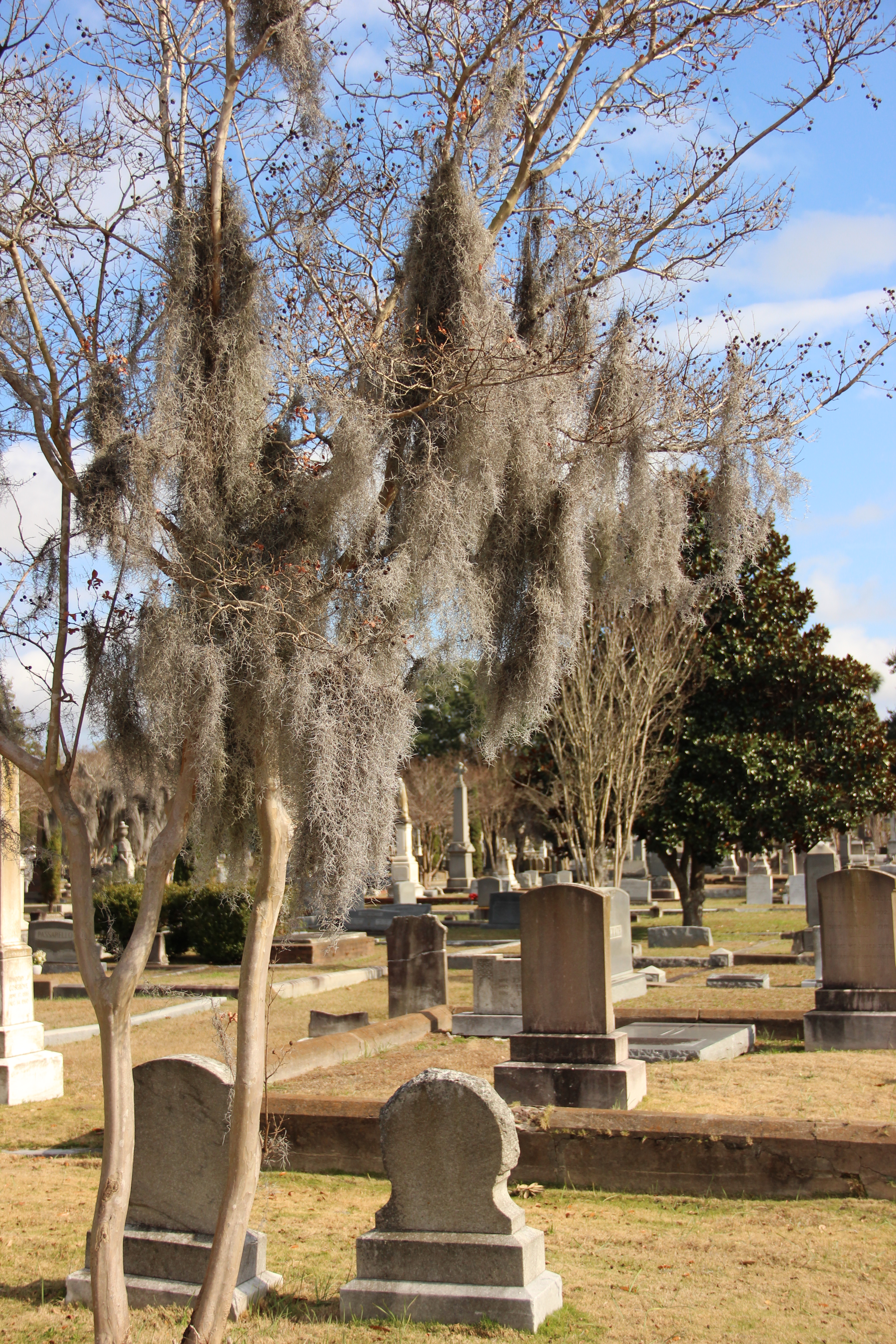
Spanish Moss in Magnolia Cemetery in Charleston, South Carolina.

One anecdote about the origin of Spanish moss is called "the Meanest Man Who Ever Lived", in which the man's white hair grew very long and got caught on trees.

Spanish moss was introduced to Hawaii in the nineteenth century. It became a popular ornamental and lei plant. In Hawaii, it was named "ʻumiʻumi-o-Dole" after the beard of Sanford B. Dole, the first president of the Provisional Government of Hawaii. It is also known as hinahina, ("silvery") borrowing the name of the native heliotrope used in lei until shoreline development made access difficult. It has become a substitute for the native hinahina in lei used for pageantry. In the early 21st century the plant was heavily marketed as "Pele's hair"/"lauoho-o-Pele", which actually refers to a type of filamentous volcanic glass.

== Human uses ==
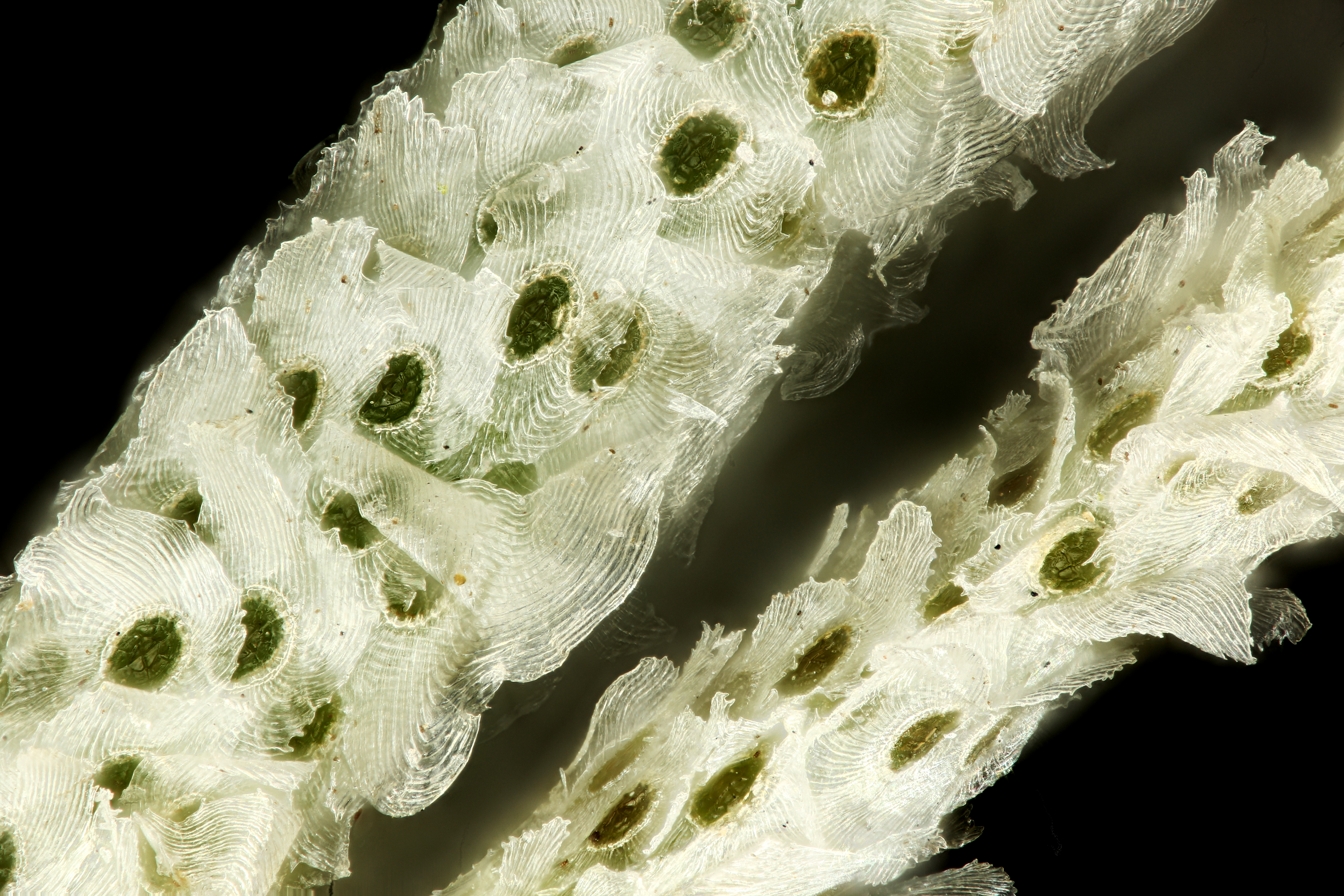
Spanish moss under 20x magnification, showing scale-like trichomes

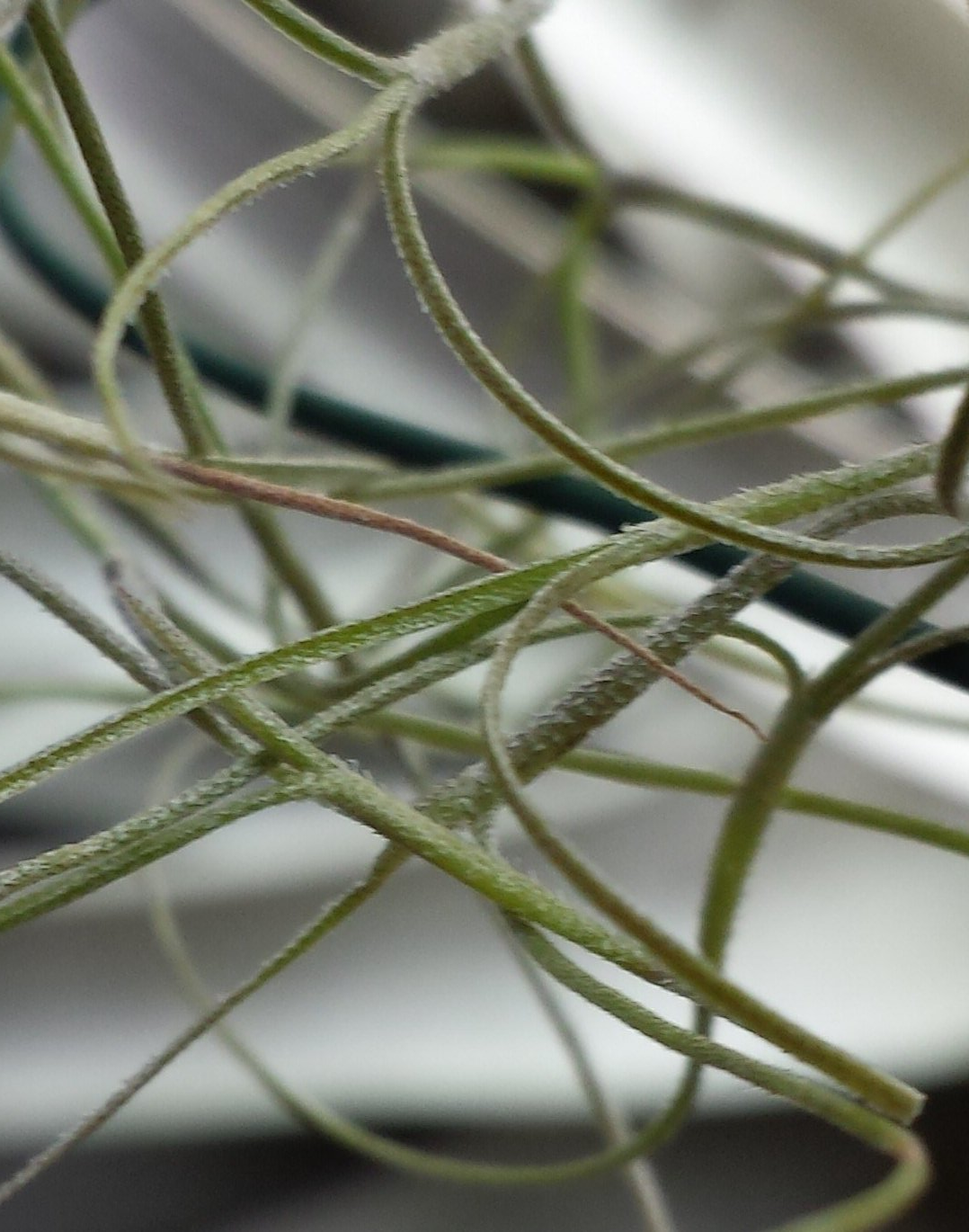
Tillandsia 'Munro's Filiformis'

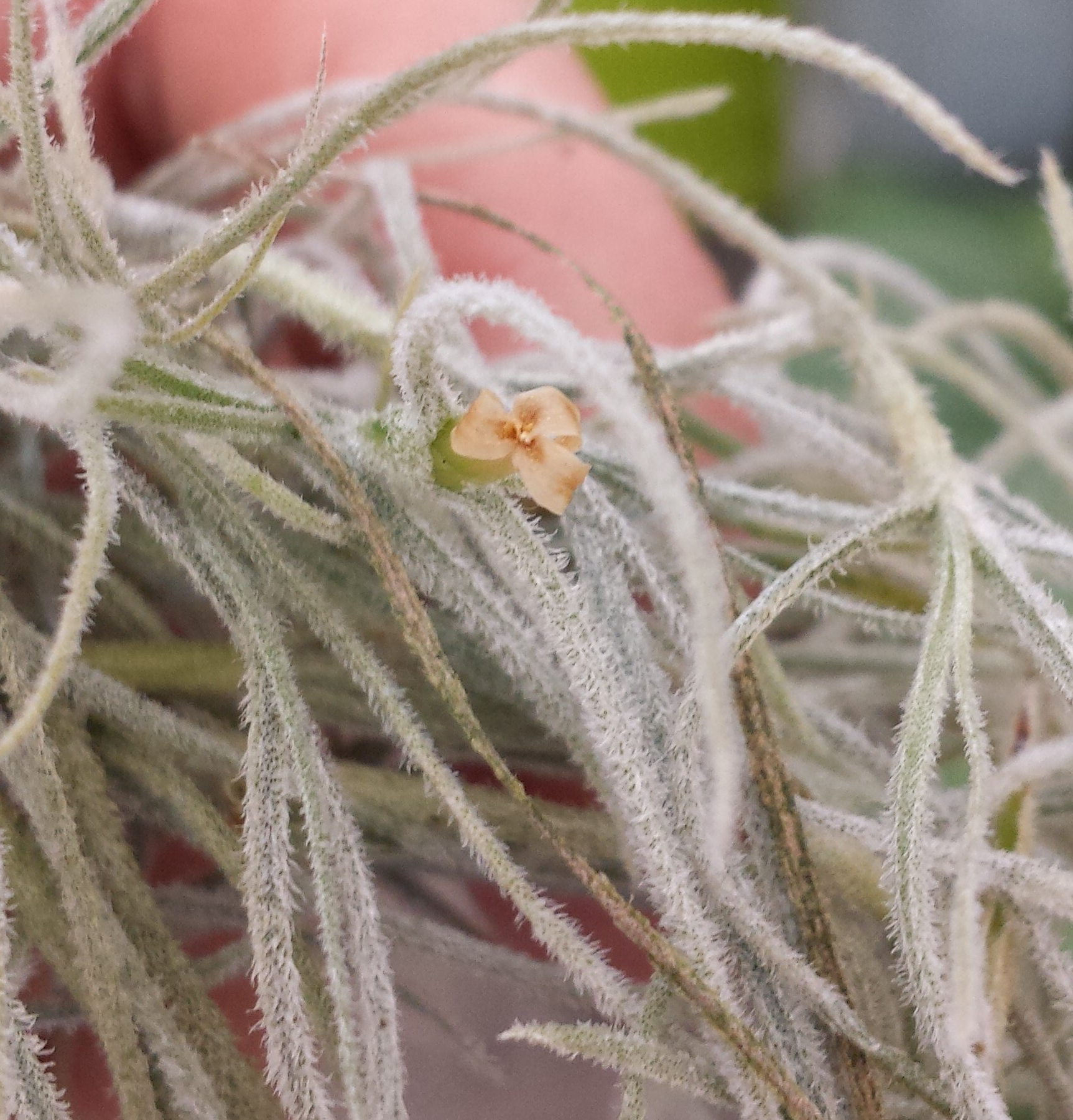
Tillandsia 'Odin's Genuina'

Spanish moss has been used for various purposes, including building insulation, mulch, packing material, mattress stuffing, and fiber. In the early 1900s it was used commercially in the padding of car seats. More than 10,000 tons of processed Spanish moss was produced in 1939. Today, it is collected in smaller quantities for use in arts and crafts, as bedding for flower gardens, and as an ingredient in bousillage, a traditional wall covering material. In some parts of Latin America and Louisiana, it is used in nativity scenes.

In the desert regions of southwestern United States, dried Spanish moss is sometimes used in the manufacture of evaporative coolers, colloquially known as "swamp coolers" (and in some areas as "desert coolers"), which are used to cool homes and offices much less expensively than air conditioners. The cooling technology uses a pump that squirts water onto a pad made of Spanish moss plants; a fan then pulls air through the pad, and into the building. Evaporation of the water on the pads serves to reduce air temperature, cooling the building.

== Varieties and cultivars ==
- Tillandsia 'Maurice's Robusta'
- Tillandsia 'Munro's Filiformis' – a natural variety with very fine, green leaves that is native to Paraguay and that is also known in the United States by the trade designations Tillandsia usneoides El Finito and Silver Ghost, it conforms to the description of the now-defunct variety Tillandsia usneoides var. filiformis (André) Mez
- Tillandsia 'Odin's Genuina' : a natural variety with brown rather than green or yellow flower petals that is native to Guatemala and Mexico
- Tillandsia 'Spanish Gold'
- Tillandsia 'Tight and Curly'

=== Hybrids ===
- Tillandsia 'Nezley' (Tillandsia usneoides × mallemontii)
- Tillandsia 'Kimberly' (Tillandsia usneoides × recurvata)
- Tillandsia 'Old Man's Gold' (Tillandsia crocata × usneoides)

== See also ==
- Lace lichen, an organism of similar habit and appearance
