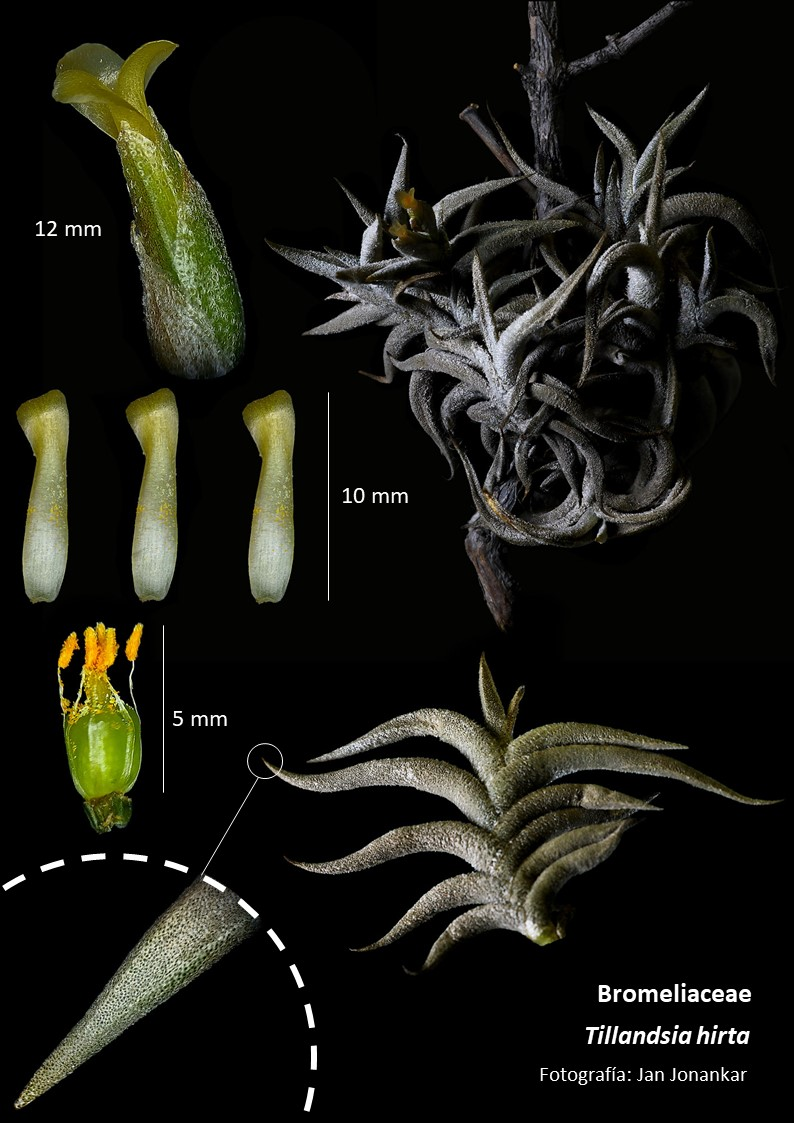

Scientific classification
- Kingdom: Plantae
- Clade: Tracheophytes
- Clade: Angiosperms
- Clade: Monocots
- Clade: Commelinids
- Order: Poales
- Family: Bromeliaceae
- Genus: Tillandsia
- Subgenus: Tillandsia subg. Diaphoranthema
- Species: T. hirta

Binomial name
- Tillandsia hirta W. Till & L. Hromadnik

= Tillandsia hirta =

Species of flowering plant

Tillandsia hirta is a species in the genus Tillandsia. This species is native to Bolivia, Peru, and Salta Province in Argentina.
