= Tillandsia spiralipetala =

Scientific classification
- Kingdom: Plantae
- Clade: Tracheophytes
- Clade: Angiosperms
- Clade: Monocots
- Clade: Commelinids
- Order: Poales
- Family: Bromeliaceae
- Genus: Tillandsia
- Subgenus: Tillandsia subg. Diaphoranthema
- Species: T. spiralipetala

Binomial name
- Tillandsia spiralipetala Gouda

Species of flowering plant

Tillandsia spiralipetala is a plant species in the genus Tillandsia. This species is native to Bolivia and Ecuador.
