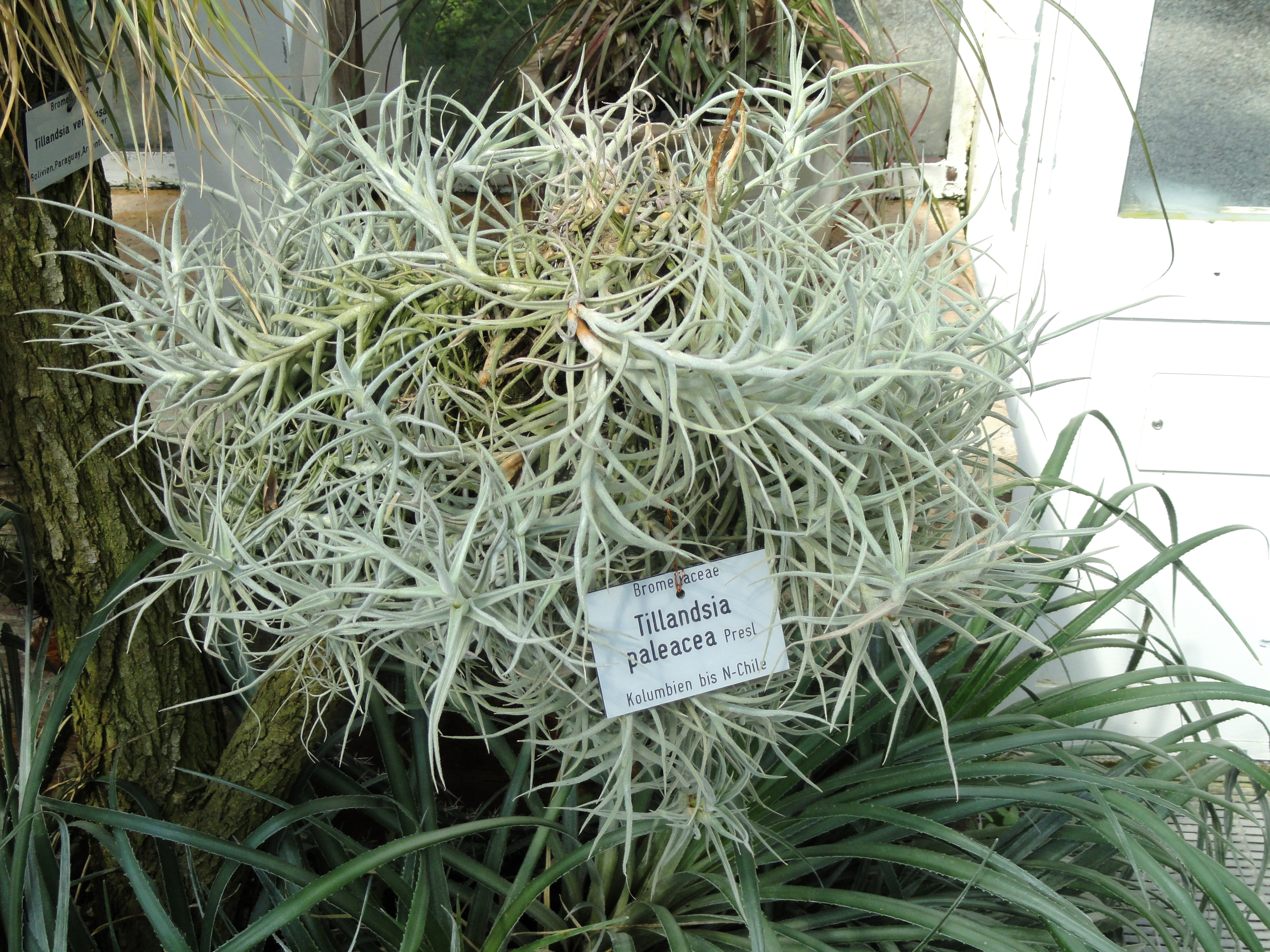

Scientific classification
- Kingdom: Plantae
- Clade: Tracheophytes
- Clade: Angiosperms
- Clade: Monocots
- Clade: Commelinids
- Order: Poales
- Family: Bromeliaceae
- Genus: Tillandsia
- Subgenus: Tillandsia subg. Phytarrhiza
- Species: T. paleacea

Binomial name
- Tillandsia paleacea Presl

= Tillandsia paleacea =

Species of plant

Tillandsia paleacea is a species in the genus Tillandsia. This species is found from Colombia to Chile in arid biomes.

== Cultivars ==
- Tillandsia 'Sweet Isabel'
