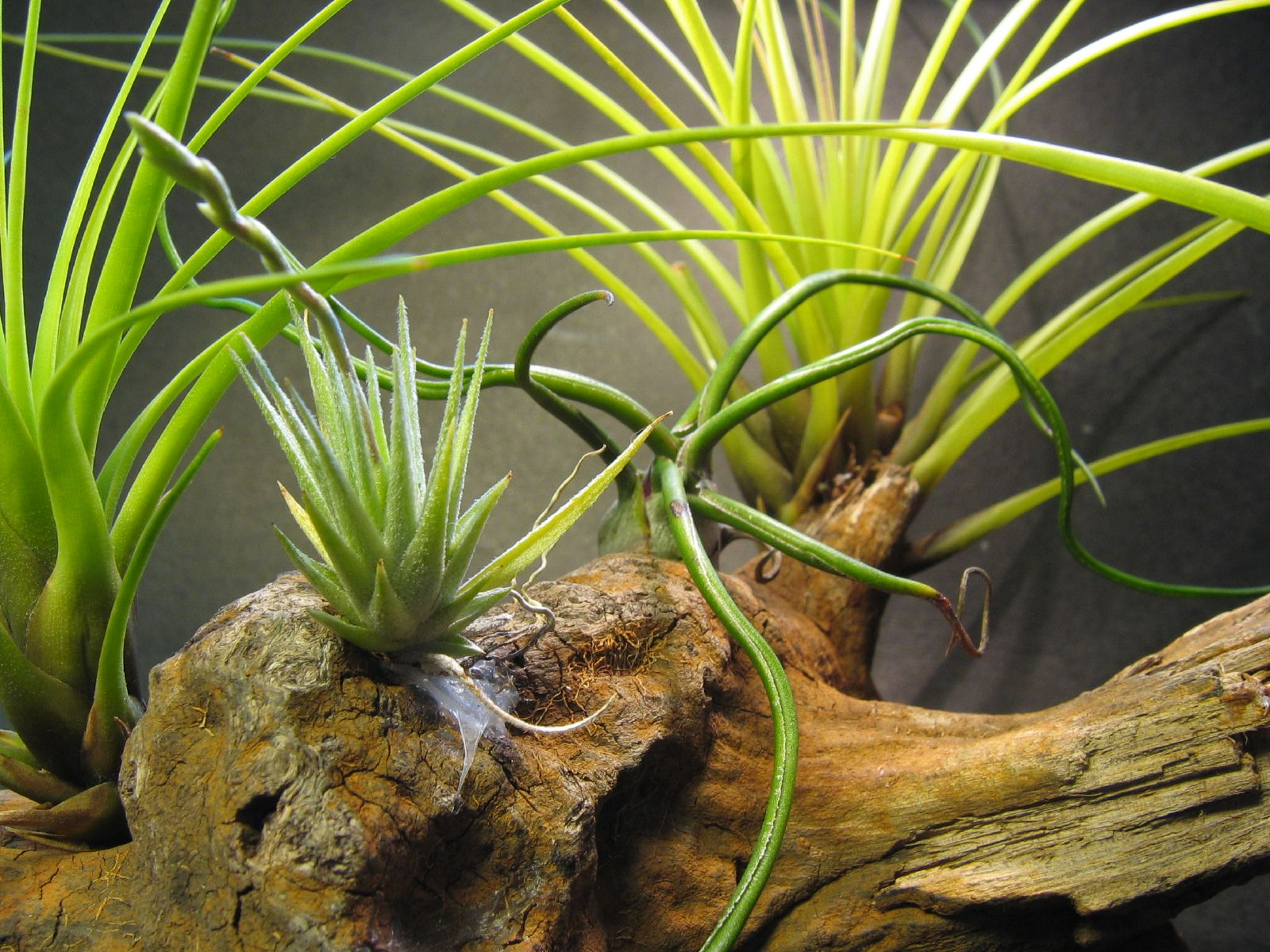

Scientific classification
- Kingdom: Plantae
- Clade: Tracheophytes
- Clade: Angiosperms
- Clade: Monocots
- Clade: Commelinids
- Order: Poales
- Family: Bromeliaceae
- Genus: Tillandsia
- Subgenus: Tillandsia subg. Diaphoranthema
- Species: T. loliacea

Binomial name
- Tillandsia loliacea Mart. ex Schult. & Schult.f.

Synonyms
- Tillandsia undulata Baker; Tillandsia quadriflora Baker; Tillandsia atrichoides S.Moore

= Tillandsia loliacea =

Species of flowering plant

Tillandsia loliacea is a plant species in the genus Tillandsia. This species is native to Bolivia, Paraguay, Argentina, and Brazil.
