= Tillandsia myosura =

Scientific classification
- Kingdom: Plantae
- Clade: Tracheophytes
- Clade: Angiosperms
- Clade: Monocots
- Clade: Commelinids
- Order: Poales
- Family: Bromeliaceae
- Genus: Tillandsia
- Subgenus: Tillandsia subg. Diaphoranthema
- Species: T. myosura

Binomial name
- Tillandsia myosura Grisebach ex Baker

Synonyms
- Tillandsia nappii Lorentz & Niederl.

Species of flowering plant

Tillandsia myosura is a plant species in the genus Tillandsia. This species is native to Bolivia, Argentina, Paraguay, and Uruguay.
