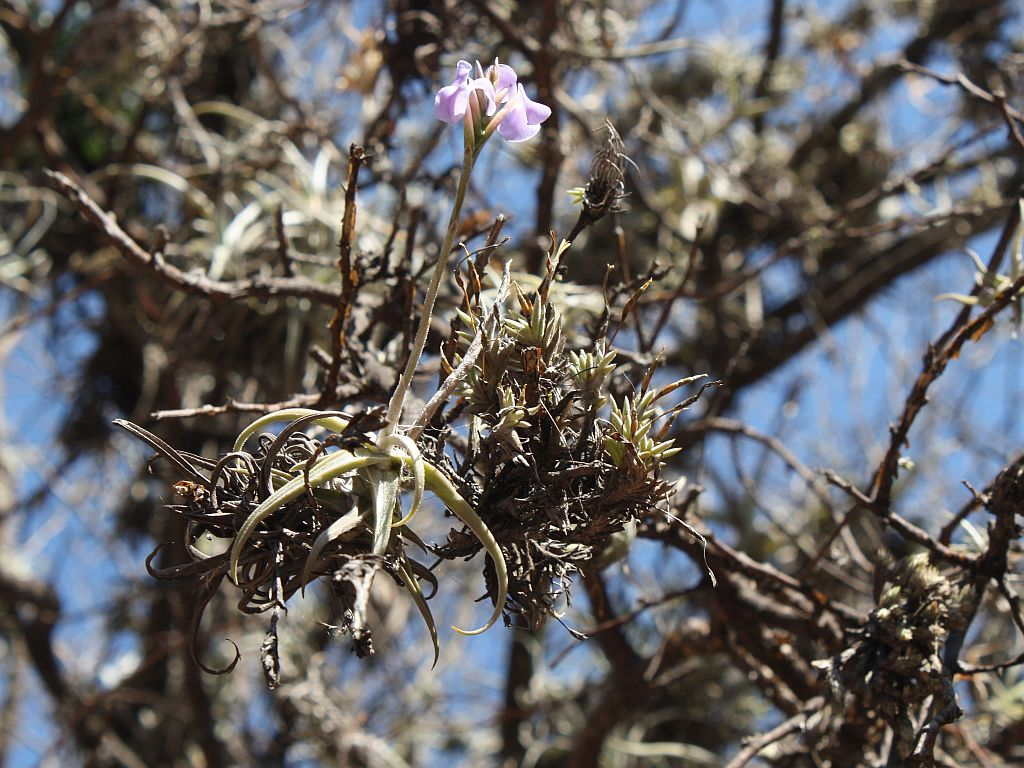

Conservation status
- Least Concern (IUCN 3.1)

Scientific classification
- Kingdom: Plantae
- Clade: Tracheophytes
- Clade: Angiosperms
- Clade: Monocots
- Clade: Commelinids
- Order: Poales
- Family: Bromeliaceae
- Genus: Tillandsia
- Subgenus: Tillandsia subg. Phytarrhiza
- Species: T. reichenbachii

Binomial name
- Tillandsia reichenbachii Baker

Synonyms
- Tillandsia duratii subsp. reichenbachii (Baker) Halda; Tillandsia euosma Speg. Tillandsia herzogii Wittm. Tillandsia tucumanensis Mez

= Tillandsia reichenbachii =

Species of plant

Tillandsia reichenbachii is a species of flowering plant in the Bromeliaceae family. This species is native to Bolivia and Argentina.
