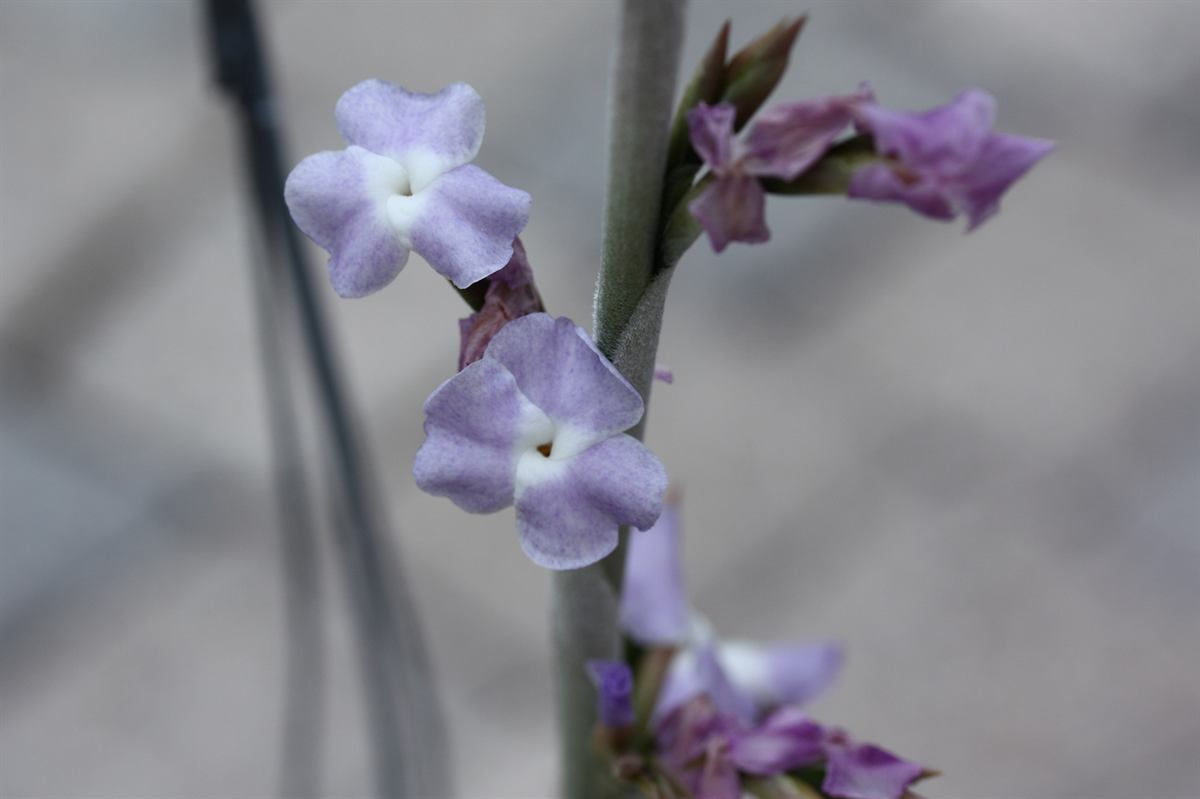

Scientific classification
- Kingdom: Plantae
- Clade: Tracheophytes
- Clade: Angiosperms
- Clade: Monocots
- Clade: Commelinids
- Order: Poales
- Family: Bromeliaceae
- Genus: Tillandsia
- Subgenus: Tillandsia subg. Phytarrhiza
- Species: T. duratii

Binomial name
- Tillandsia duratii Vis.

= Tillandsia duratii =

Species of plant

Tillandsia duratii is a species in the genus Tillandsia, subgenus Phytarrhiza. This species is native to Bolivia, Paraguay, Argentina, Uruguay, and Brazil.

== Cultivars ==
- Tillandsia 'Burnt Fingers'
- Tillandsia 'Lilac Spire'
- Tillandsia 'Pacific Blue'
- Tillandsia 'Wo'
