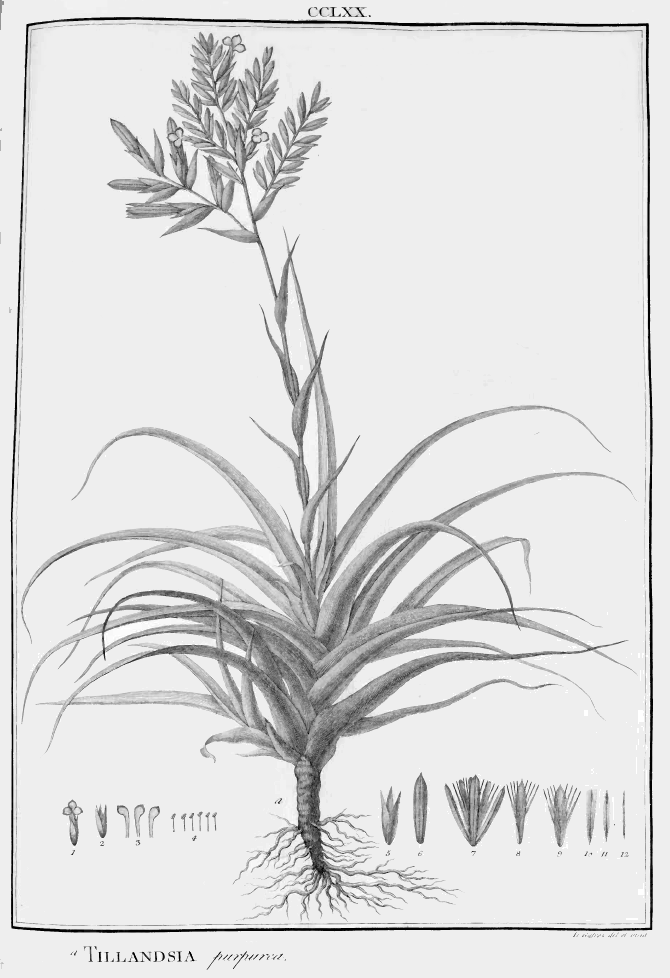

Scientific classification
- Kingdom: Plantae
- Clade: Tracheophytes
- Clade: Angiosperms
- Clade: Monocots
- Clade: Commelinids
- Order: Poales
- Family: Bromeliaceae
- Genus: Tillandsia
- Subgenus: Tillandsia subg. Phytarrhiza
- Species: T. purpurea

Binomial name
- Tillandsia purpurea Ruiz & Pav.

Synonyms
- Platystachys purpurea (Ruiz & Pav.) Beer; Tillandsia azurea C.Presl; Tillandsia scoparia Willd. ex Schult. & Schult.f.; Tillandsia longibracteata Meyen; Anoplophytum longibracteatum (Meyen) Beer; Platystachys azurea (C.Presl) Beer; Platystachys scoparia Beer

= Tillandsia purpurea =

Species of plant

Tillandsia purpurea is a species of flowering plant in the family Bromeliaceae. It is endemic to Peru, first described by Ruiz and Pavón in 1802.

== Cultivars ==
- Tillandsia 'Shooting Star'
