= Tillandsia funebris =

Scientific classification
- Kingdom: Plantae
- Clade: Tracheophytes
- Clade: Angiosperms
- Clade: Monocots
- Clade: Commelinids
- Order: Poales
- Family: Bromeliaceae
- Genus: Tillandsia
- Subgenus: Tillandsia subg. Diaphoranthema
- Species: T. funebris

Binomial name
- Tillandsia funebris Castellanos

Species of flowering plant

Tillandsia funebris is a plant species in the genus Tillandsia. This species is native to Bolivia.

== Cultivars ==
- Tillandsia 'Miss Mini'
