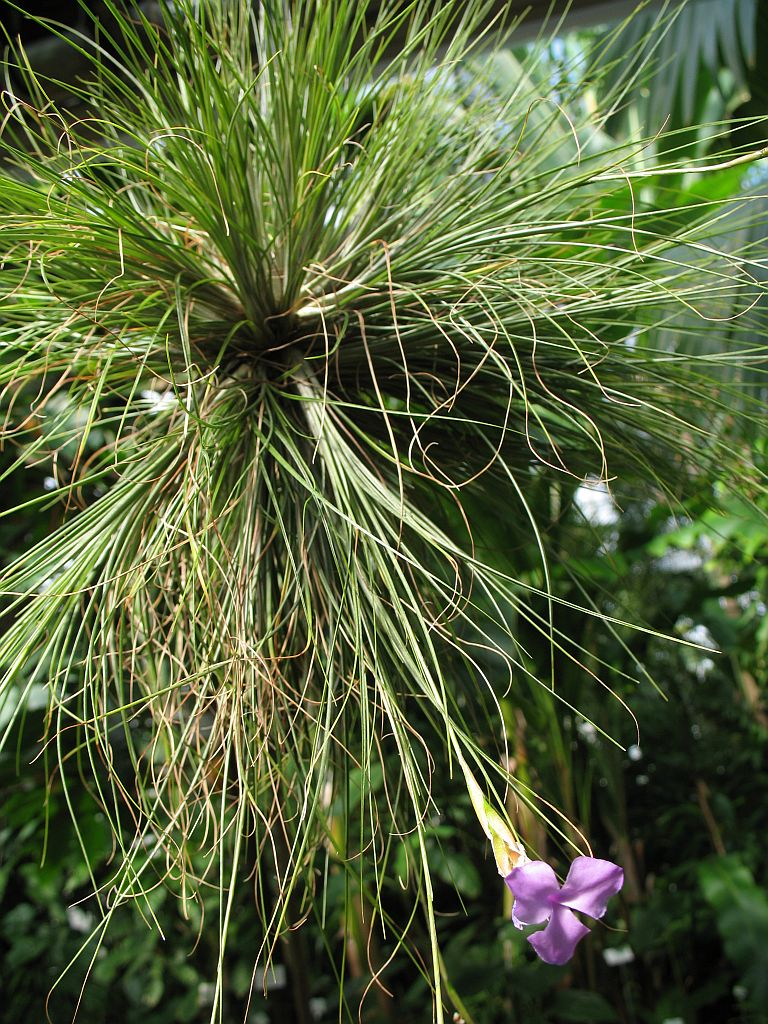

Scientific classification
- Kingdom: Plantae
- Clade: Tracheophytes
- Clade: Angiosperms
- Clade: Monocots
- Clade: Commelinids
- Order: Poales
- Family: Bromeliaceae
- Genus: Tillandsia
- Subgenus: Tillandsia subg. Phytarrhiza
- Species: T. linearis

Binomial name
- Tillandsia linearis Vellozo

= Tillandsia linearis =

Species of plant

Tillandsia linearis is a species in the genus Tillandsia. This species is endemic to Brazil.
