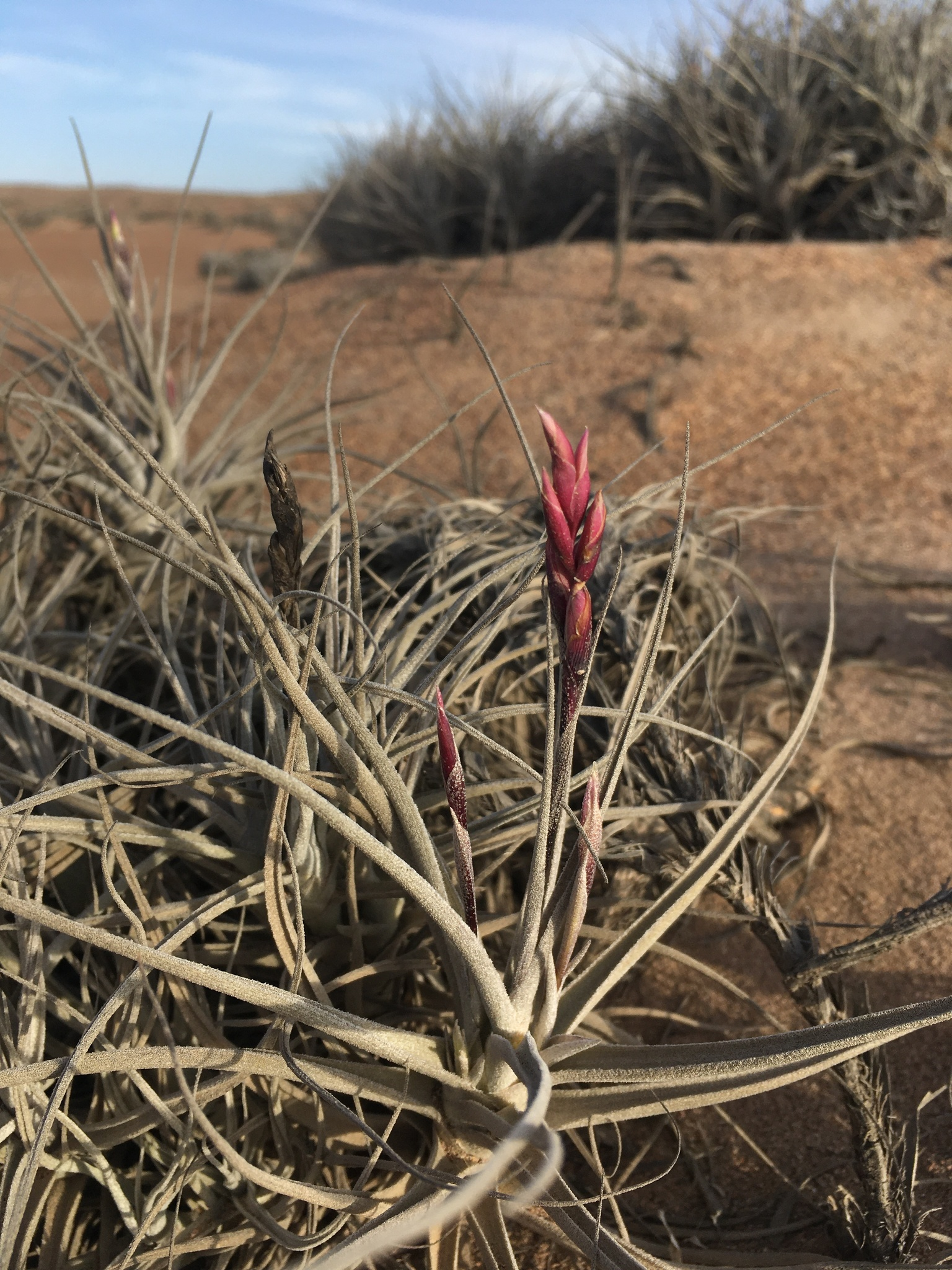
- Tillandsia marconae in Arica, Chile

Scientific classification
- Kingdom: Plantae
- Clade: Tracheophytes
- Clade: Angiosperms
- Clade: Monocots
- Clade: Commelinids
- Order: Poales
- Family: Bromeliaceae
- Genus: Tillandsia
- Subgenus: Tillandsia subg. Phytarrhiza (Vis.) Baker

Species
- See text

= Tillandsia subg. Phytarrhiza =

Subgenus of flowering plants

Tillandsia subg. Phytarrhiza is a subgenus of the genus Tillandsia.

== Species ==
Species accepted by Encyclopedia of Bromeliads as of October 2022:

Image	Name	Distribution
	Tillandsia arhiza Mez 1896	Paraguay to Brazil (Minas Gerais)
	Tillandsia aurea Mez 1906	Peru (Ancash)
	Tillandsia cacticola L.B.Sm. 1954	Peru
	Tillandsia caerulea Kunth 1816	Ecuador to NW. Peru
	Tillandsia duratii Vis. 1841	Bolivia to Uruguay.
	Tillandsia grao-mogolensis Silveira 1931	Brazil (Bahia, Minas Gerais)
	Tillandsia humilis C.Presl 1827	Ecuador to Peru
	Tillandsia itatiensis E.H. Souza & Leodegario 2020	Brazil (Bahia)
	Tillandsia jequiensis L. Hrom. & H. Hrom. 2020	Brazil (Bahia)
	Tillandsia kirschnekii Rauh & W.Till 1983	Peru (Apurímac)
	Tillandsia linearis Vell. 1829	Brazil (Rio de Janeiro to Santa Catarina)
	Tillandsia mallemontii Glaz. ex Mez 1894	Brazil
	Tillandsia marconae W.Till & Vitek 1985	Peru (Ica)
	Tillandsia paleacea C.Pres 1827	Bolivia, Chile, Colombia, Peru
	Tillandsia peiranoi A.Cast. 1938	Argentina (Salta)
	Tillandsia purpurea Ruiz & Pav. 1802	Peru
	Tillandsia reichenbachii Baker 1889	Argentina, Bolivia, Paraguay
	Tillandsia santiagoensis H.Hrom. & L.Hrom. 2020	Bolivia
	Tillandsia straminea Kunth 1816	Ecuador, Peru
	Tillandsia streptocarpa Baker 1887	Argentina, Bolivia, Brazil, Paraguay, Peru
