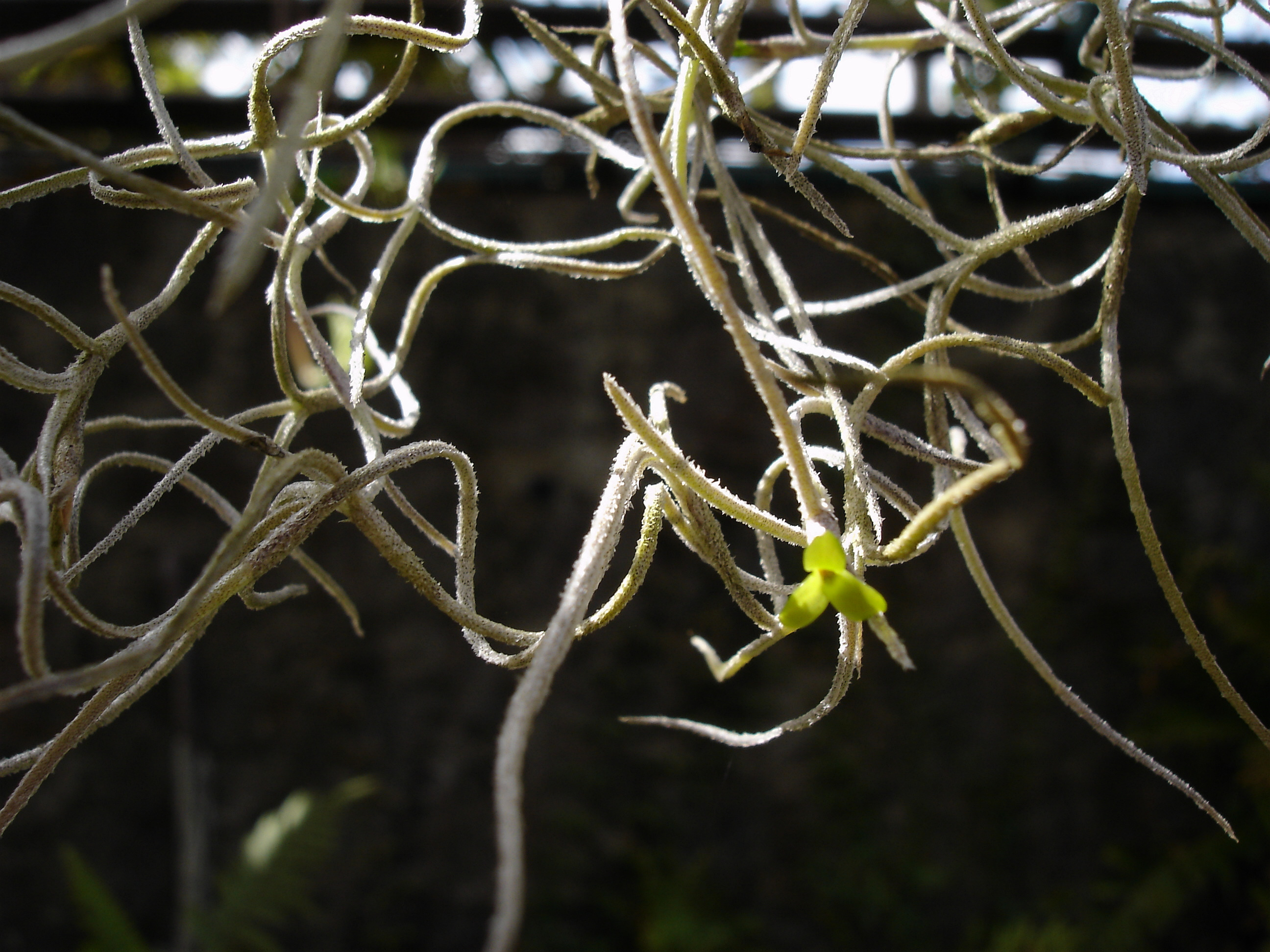
- Tillandsia usneoides ("Spanish moss")

Scientific classification
- Kingdom: Plantae
- Clade: Tracheophytes
- Clade: Angiosperms
- Clade: Monocots
- Clade: Commelinids
- Order: Poales
- Family: Bromeliaceae
- Genus: Tillandsia
- Subgenus: Tillandsia subg. Diaphoranthema (Beer) Baker

Type species
- Tillandsia recurvata (L.) L.

Species
- See text

= Tillandsia subg. Diaphoranthema =

Subgenus of flowering plants

Tillandsia subg. Diaphoranthema is a subgenus of the genus Tillandsia.

== Species ==
Species accepted by Encyclopedia of Bromeliads as of October 2022:

Image	Name	Distribution
	Tillandsia aizoides Mez 1896	Bolivia, Argentina
	Tillandsia andicola Gillies ex Baker 1878	Argentina
	Tillandsia angulosa Mez 1896	Argentina (La Rioja, Mendoza)
	Tillandsia bandensis Baker 1888	Bolivia to Uruguay
	Tillandsia brealitoensis L.Hrom. 1984	Argentina (Salta)
	Tillandsia caliginosa W.Till 1984	Bolivia, Uruguay
	Tillandsia capillaris Ruiz & Pav. 1802	Argentina, Bolivia, Chile Central, Chile North, Ecuador, Paraguay, Peru
	Tillandsia castellanii L.B.Sm. 1934	Argentina (San Luis, Córdoba)
	Tillandsia copynii Gouda 1988	Brazil (Minas Gerais)
	Tillandsia cotagaitensis L.Hrom. 1984	Bolivia
	Tillandsia crocata (E.Morren) N.E.Br. 1882	Brazil, Bolivia, Argentina, Paraguay and Uruguay
	Tillandsia erecta Gillies ex Baker 1878	Argentina
	Tillandsia funebris A.Cast. 1933	Argentina, Bolivia, Paraguay
	Tillandsia gilliesii Baker 1878	Argentina, Bolivia, Chile
	Tillandsia hirta W.Till & L.Hrom. 1984	Peru, Argentina (Salta)
	Tillandsia landbeckii Philippi 1864	Chile, Peru
	Tillandsia loliacea Mart. ex Schult. & Schult.f. 1830	Argentina, Bolivia, Brazil, Paraguay, Uruguay
	Tillandsia minutiflora Donadío 2011	Argentina, Bolivia, Paraguay, Peru
	Tillandsia mollis H.Hrom. & W.Till 1983	Argentina, Bolivia
	Tillandsia myosura Griseb. ex Baker 1878	Argentina, Bolivia, Uruguay
	Tillandsia pedicellata (Mez) A.Cast. 1945	Argentina, Bolivia
	Tillandsia porongoensis L.Hrom. & P.Schneider 1988	Argentina (La Rioja)
	Tillandsia rectangula Baker 1878	Argentina, Bolivia
	Tillandsia recurvata (L.) L. 1762	southern United States to northern Argentina and Chile
	Tillandsia retorta Griseb. ex Baker 1879	Argentina
	Tillandsia spiralipetala Gouda 1986	Bolivia, Ecuador, Peru
	Tillandsia tenebra L.Hrom. & W.Till 1991	Argentina (La Rioja)
	Tillandsia tricholepis Baker 1878	Argentina, Bolivia, Brazil, Paraguay, Uruguay
	Tillandsia usneoides (L.) L.	Southeastern United States (including Puerto Rico and the U.S. Virgin Islands) to Argentina
	Tillandsia virescens Ruiz & Pav.	Argentina, Bolivia, Chile, Peru
