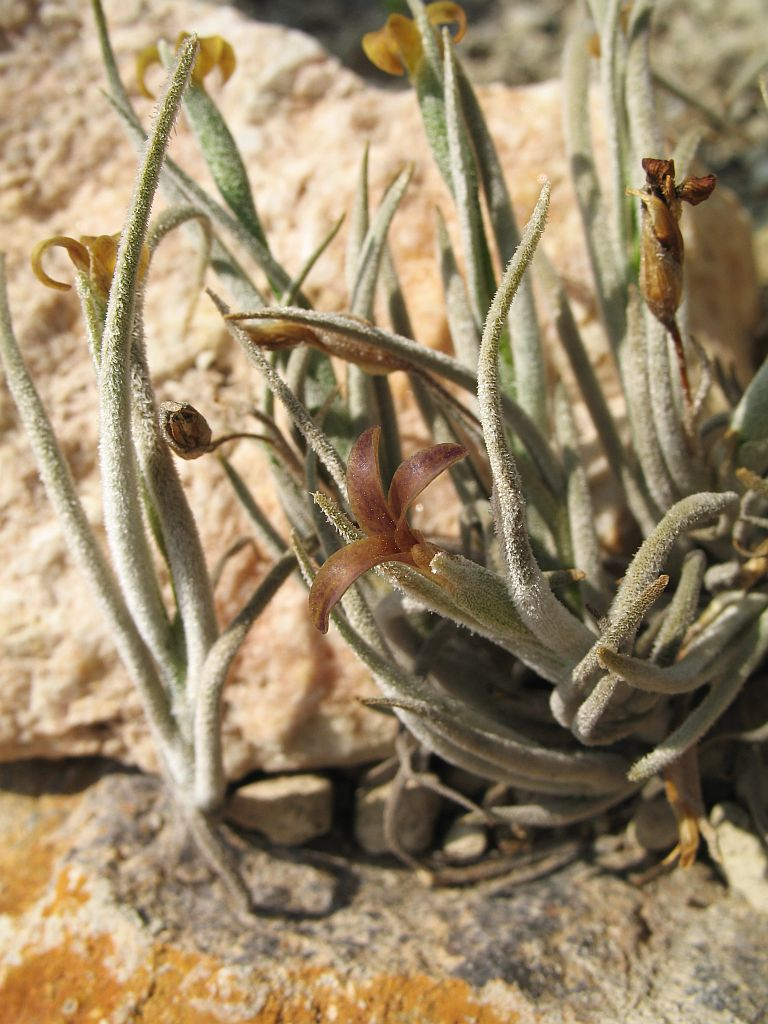

Scientific classification
- Kingdom: Plantae
- Clade: Tracheophytes
- Clade: Angiosperms
- Clade: Monocots
- Clade: Commelinids
- Order: Poales
- Family: Bromeliaceae
- Genus: Tillandsia
- Subgenus: Tillandsia subg. Diaphoranthema
- Species: T. virescens

Binomial name
- Tillandsia virescens Ruiz & Pav.

Synonyms
- Diaphoranthema virescens (Ruiz & Pav.) Beer; Tillandsia capillaris f. cordobensis (Hieron.) L.B.Sm.; Tillandsia capillaris f. virescens (Ruiz & Pav.) L.B.Sm.; Tillandsia cordobensis Hieron.; Tillandsia dependens var. sanzinii Hic ken; Tillandsia dependens Hieron. ex Mez, A.L.P.P.de Candolle & A.C.P.de Candolle; Tillandsia hieronymi var. lichenoides (Hieron.) A.Cast.; Tillandsia kuehhasii W.Till; Tillandsia lichenoides Hieron.; Tillandsia propinqua Gay; Tillandsia pusilla Gillies ex Baker; Tillandsia stolpii Phil.; Tillandsia tomasii Halda; Tillandsia virescens var. sanzinii (Hicken) A.Cast.; Tillandsia williamsii Rusby

= Tillandsia virescens =

Species of flowering plant

Tillandsia virescens is a species of flowering plant in the family Bromeliaceae. This species is native to Argentina, Bolivia, Chile and Peru. It was first described in 1802.

== Gallery ==
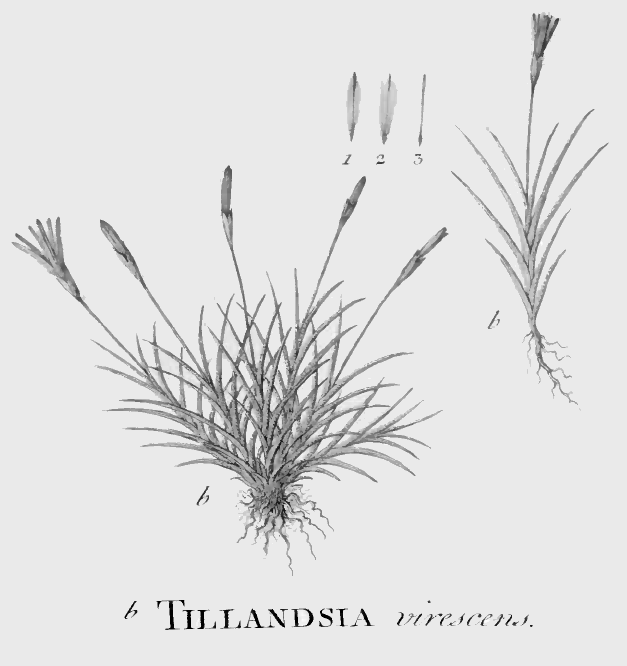
Botanical illustration

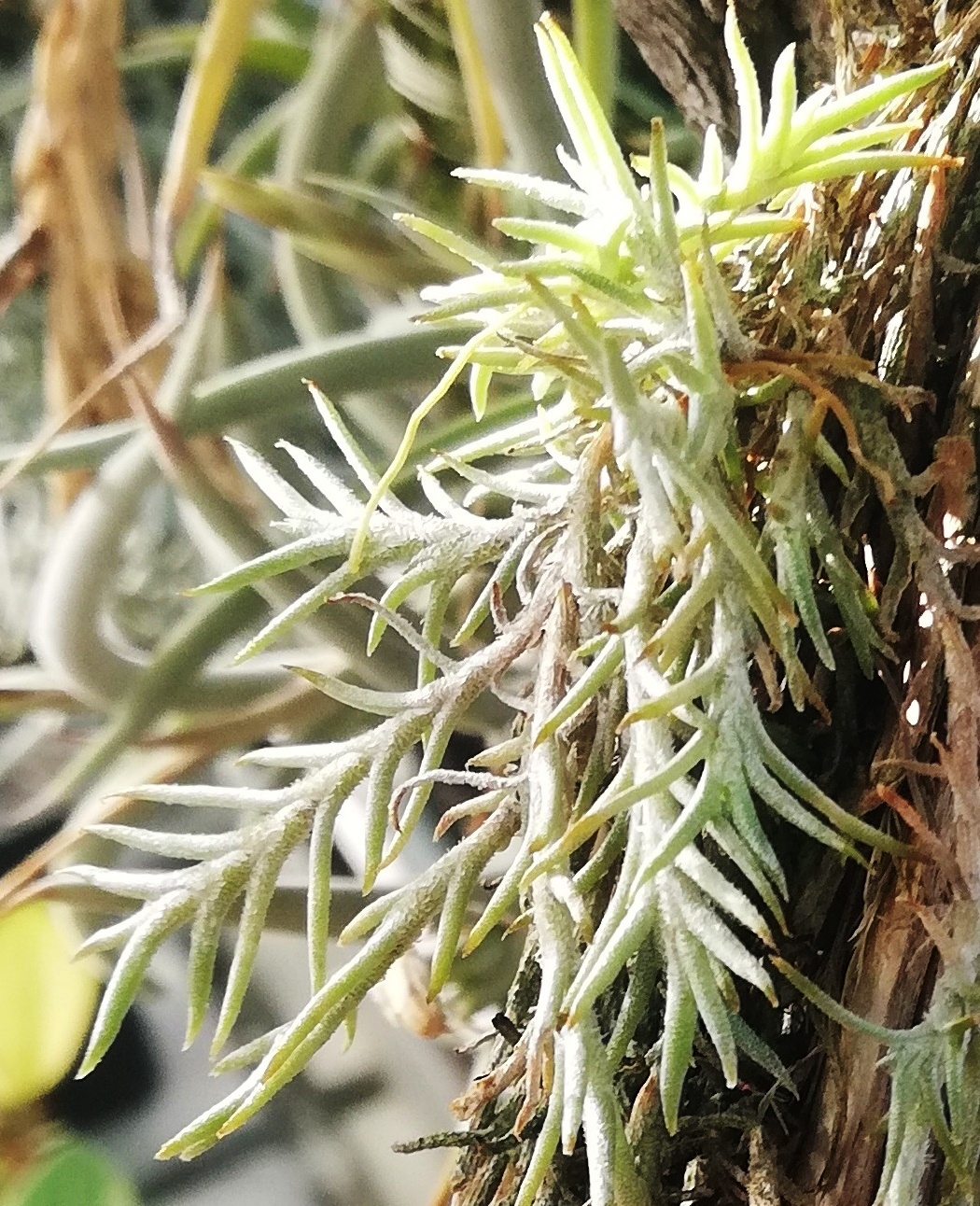
Specimen in cultivation
