= Hinahina =

Hinahina is a Hawaiian and Māori language common name for several plants, including:

- Argyroxiphium sandwicense, endemic to Hawaii
- Geranium cuneatum, endemic to Hawaii
- Heliotropium anomalum, native to Hawaii, Guam, Christmas Island, Saipan, Tinian, Wake Island, and New Caledonia
- Melicytus ramiflorus, endemic to New Zealand and the Norfolk Islands
