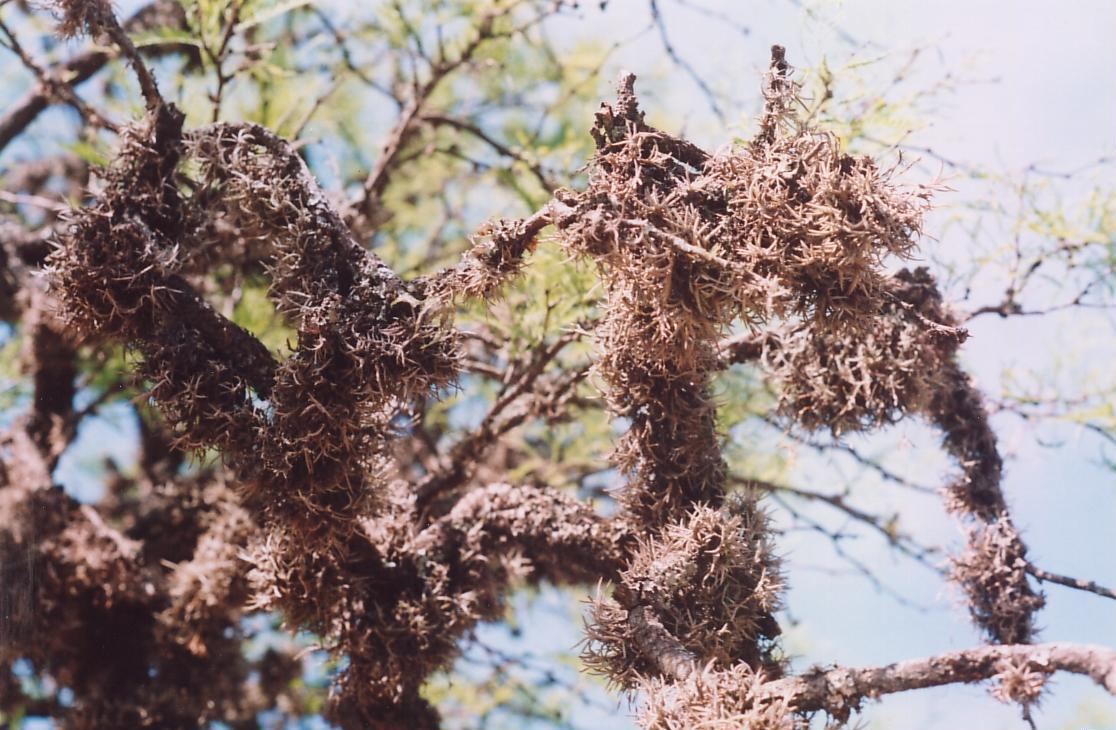

Conservation status
- Least Concern (IUCN 3.1)

Scientific classification
- Kingdom: Plantae
- Clade: Tracheophytes
- Clade: Angiosperms
- Clade: Monocots
- Clade: Commelinids
- Order: Poales
- Family: Bromeliaceae
- Genus: Tillandsia
- Subgenus: Tillandsia subg. Diaphoranthema
- Species: T. capillaris

Binomial name
- Tillandsia capillaris Ruiz & Pav.

Synonyms
- Diaphoranthema capillaris (Ruiz & Pav.) Beer; Tillandsia capillaris f. typica L.B.Sm.; Tillandsia capillaris f. hieronymi (Mez) L.B.Sm.; Tillandsia capillaris f. incana (Mez) L.B.Sm.; Tillandsia capillaris var. incana Mez; Tillandsia capillaris var. lanuginosa Mez; Tillandsia dependens f. percordobensis (Mez) A.Cast.; Tillandsia dependens var. percordobensis Mez; Tillandsia dependens var. perusneoides Mez; Tillandsia dependens f. perusneoides (Mez) A.Cast.; Tillandsia hieronymi Mez; Tillandsia incana Gillies ex Baker; Tillandsia lanuginosa Gillies ex Baker; Tillandsia permutata A.Cast.; Tillandsia propinqua var. saxicola Hieron.

= Tillandsia capillaris =

Species of flowering plant

Tillandsia capillaris is a species of flowering plant in the family Bromeliaceae. This species is native to southern and western South America (Argentina, Chile, Uruguay, Paraguay, Bolivia, Peru, and Ecuador).

Three taxa are recognized at the "form" level:

1. Tillandsia capillaris f. capillaris – most of species range
2. Tillandsia capillaris f. cordobensis (Hieron.) L.B.Sm. – Bolivia, Peru, Argentina, Chile
3. Tillandsia capillaris f. virescens (Ruiz & Pav.) L.B.Sm. – Bolivia, Peru, Argentina, Chile
