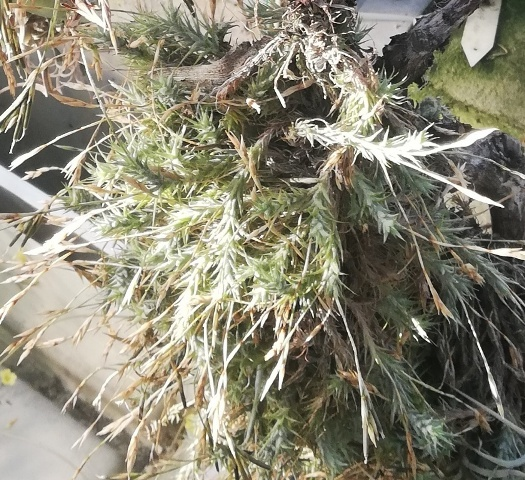

Scientific classification
- Kingdom: Plantae
- Clade: Tracheophytes
- Clade: Angiosperms
- Clade: Monocots
- Clade: Commelinids
- Order: Poales
- Family: Bromeliaceae
- Genus: Tillandsia
- Subgenus: Tillandsia subg. Diaphoranthema
- Species: T. tricholepis

Binomial name
- Tillandsia tricholepis Baker

Synonyms
- Tillandsia bryoides Griseb. ex Baker; Tillandsia polytrichoides E.Morren; Tillandsia tricholepis var. argentea Hassl.

= Tillandsia tricholepis =

Species of plant

Tillandsia tricholepis is a plant species of flowering plant in the family Bromeliaceae. It is native to Bolivia, Paraguay, Argentina, and Brazil. A curiosity of its morphology is that it is a land-dwelling plant which has no stomata, a characteristic it shares only with Stylites (or Isoetes) andicola.
