= Tillandsia rectangula =

Scientific classification
- Kingdom: Plantae
- Clade: Tracheophytes
- Clade: Angiosperms
- Clade: Monocots
- Clade: Commelinids
- Order: Poales
- Family: Bromeliaceae
- Genus: Tillandsia
- Subgenus: Tillandsia subg. Diaphoranthema
- Species: T. rectangula

Binomial name
- Tillandsia rectangula Baker

Species of plant

Tillandsia rectangula is a species of flowering plant in the Bromeliaceae family. This species is native to Bolivia and Argentina. Tillandsia rectangula was described and the name validly published by John Gilbert Baker in 1878. Tillandsia rectangula is in the genus Tillandsia, which contains between 713 and 777 species. The type species of the genus is Tillandsia utriculata. The perennials prefer a sunny situation on fresh to moist soil. They tolerate temperatures only above at least 1 °C.The plants are suited for cultivation in a temperate house.
