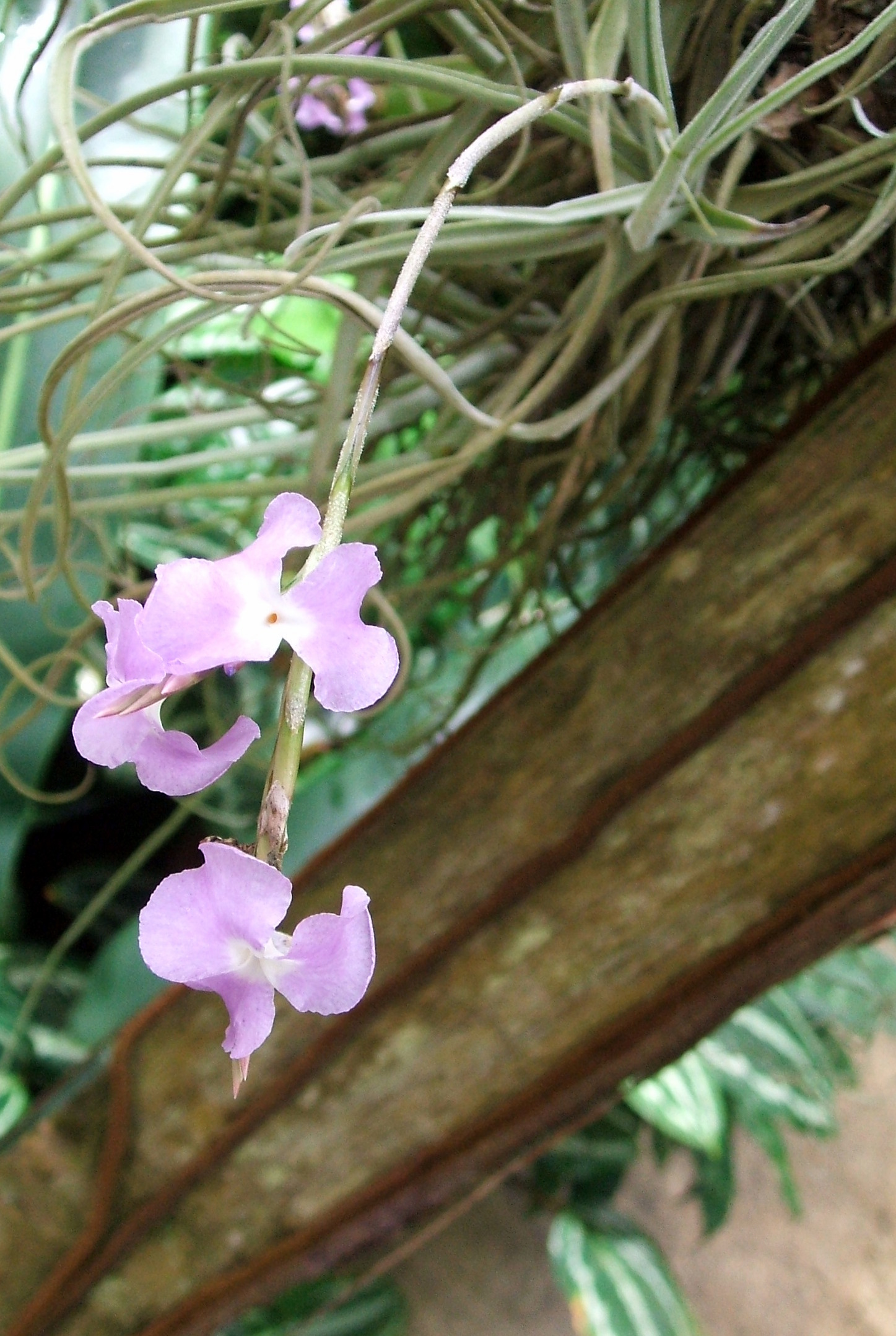
- Detail of the flower; Marie Selby Botanical Gardens, Sarasota, Florida, US

Scientific classification
- Kingdom: Plantae
- Clade: Tracheophytes
- Clade: Angiosperms
- Clade: Monocots
- Clade: Commelinids
- Order: Poales
- Family: Bromeliaceae
- Genus: Tillandsia
- Subgenus: Tillandsia subg. Phytarrhiza
- Species: T. streptocarpa

Binomial name
- Tillandsia streptocarpa Baker

Synonyms
- Tillandsia duratii subsp. streptocarpa (Baker) Halda; Tillandsia soratensis Baker; Tillandsia bakeriana Britton; Tillandsia condensata Baker; Tillandsia apoloensis Rusby

= Tillandsia streptocarpa =

Species of plant

Tillandsia streptocarpa is a species of flowering plant in the Bromeliaceae family. This species is native to Bolivia, Peru, Argentina, Paraguay, and Brazil.

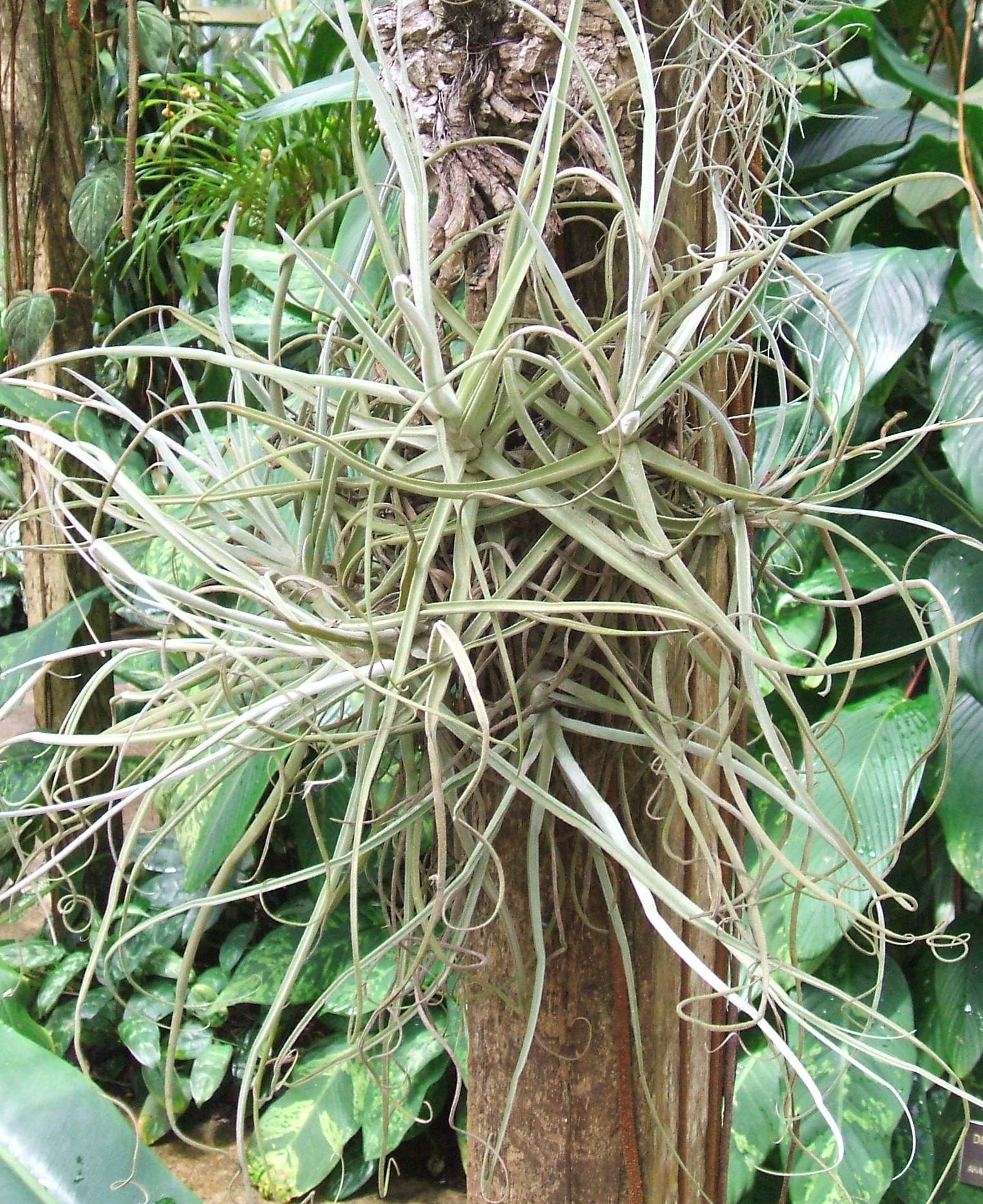
Plant at Marie Selby Botanical Gardens, Sarasota, Florida, US

== Cultivars ==
- Tillandsia 'Blue Moon'
- Tillandsia 'Pacific Blue'
- Tillandsia 'Van Der Mollis'
