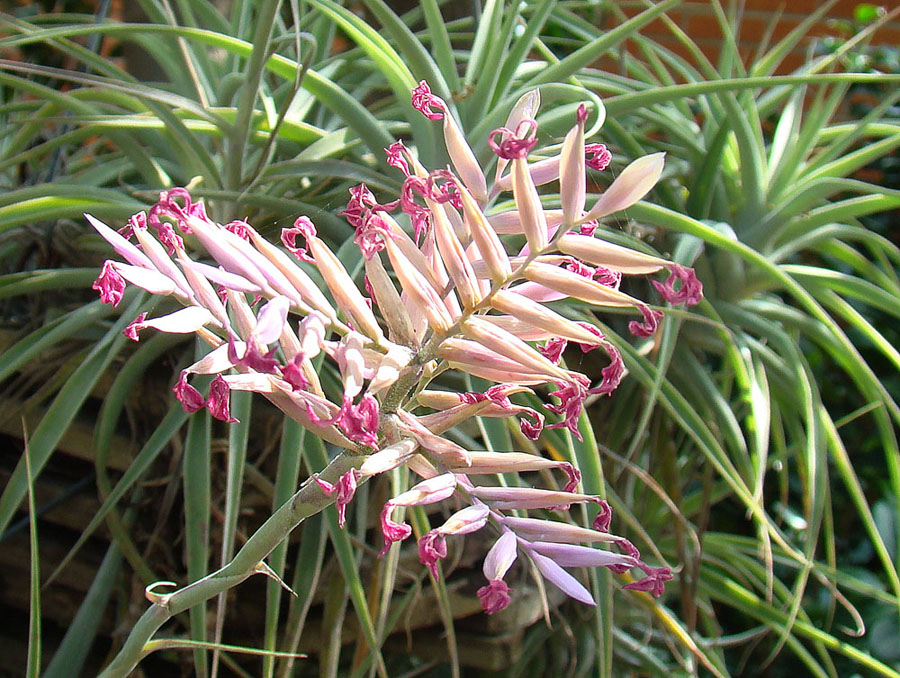

Scientific classification
- Kingdom: Plantae
- Clade: Tracheophytes
- Clade: Angiosperms
- Clade: Monocots
- Clade: Commelinids
- Order: Poales
- Family: Bromeliaceae
- Genus: Tillandsia
- Subgenus: Tillandsia subg. Phytarrhiza
- Species: T. cacticola

Binomial name
- Tillandsia cacticola L.B.Sm.

= Tillandsia cacticola =

Species of plant

Tillandsia cacticola is a species in the genus Tillandsia, endemic to Peru.

== Cultivars ==
- Tillandsia 'Splendid'
