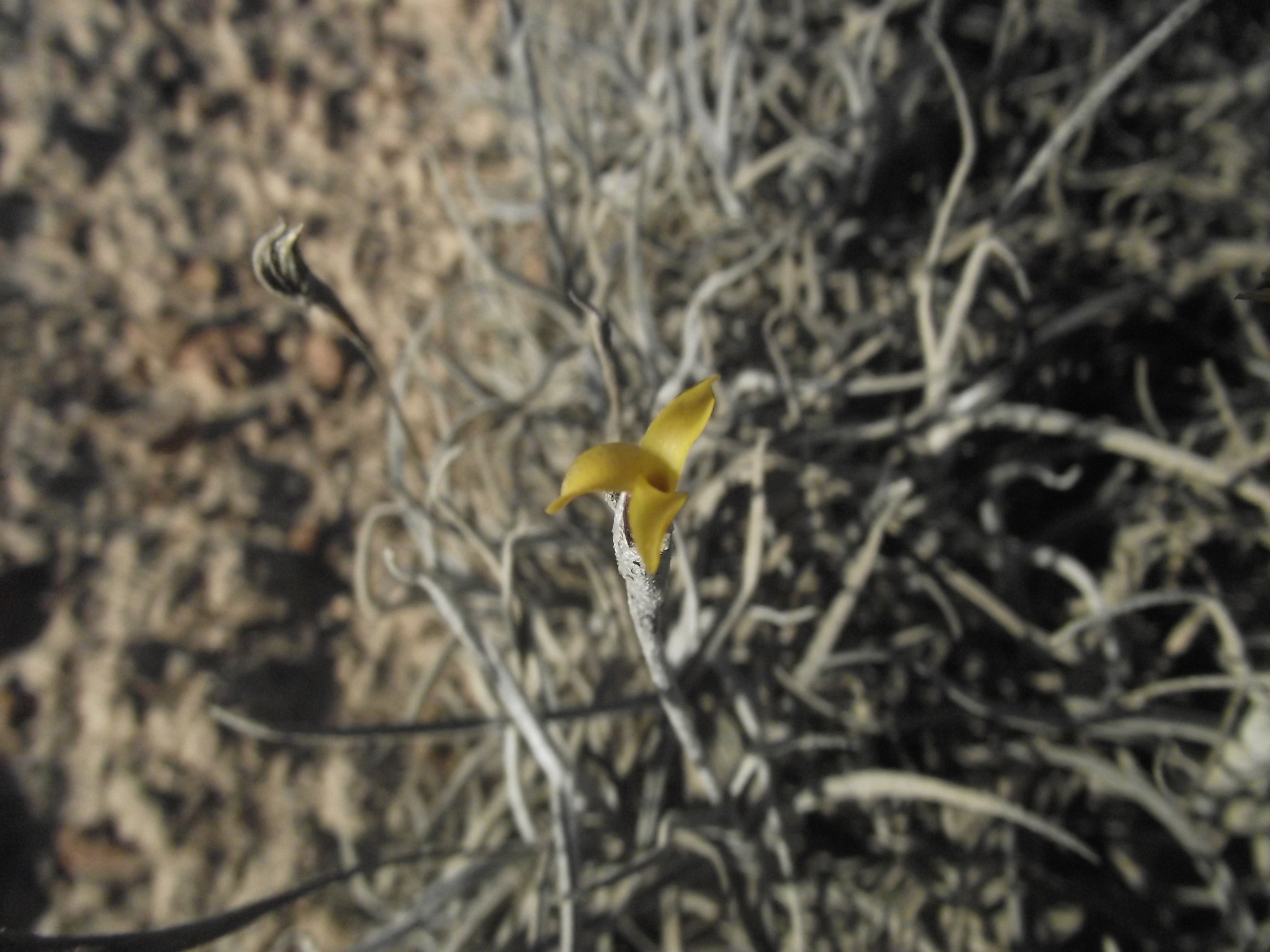

Scientific classification
- Kingdom: Plantae
- Clade: Tracheophytes
- Clade: Angiosperms
- Clade: Monocots
- Clade: Commelinids
- Order: Poales
- Family: Bromeliaceae
- Genus: Tillandsia
- Subgenus: Tillandsia subg. Diaphoranthema
- Species: T. landbeckii

Binomial name
- Tillandsia landbeckii Philippi

= Tillandsia landbeckii =

Species of flowering plant

Tillandsia landbeckii is a plant species in the genus Tillandsia. This species is native to Peru and Chile. It is one of the species of Tillandsia known as aerophytes, that grow on shifting desert soil rather than attached to other plants.

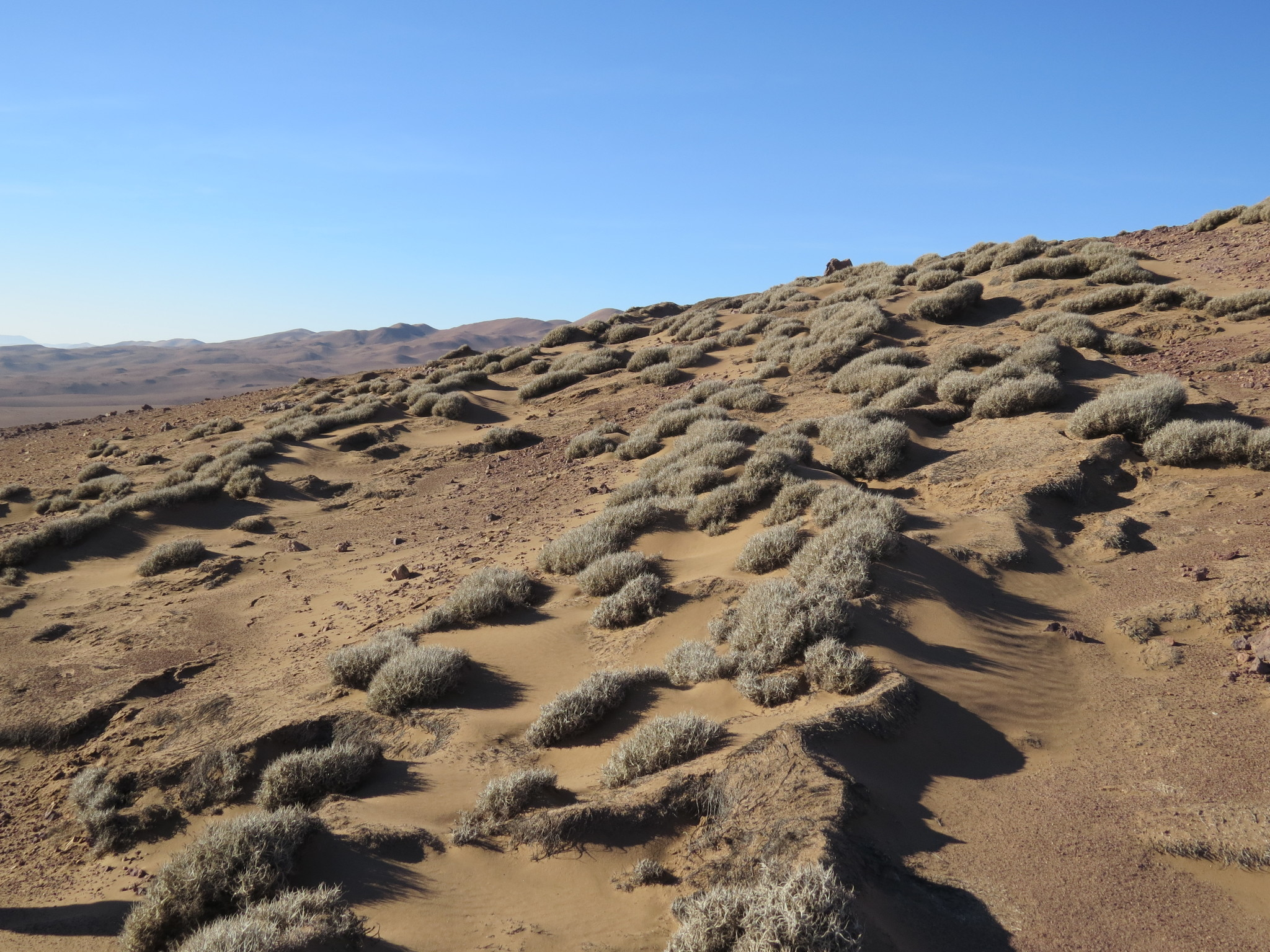
Habit in Tarapacá Region, North Chile
