= Tillandsia caliginosa =

Scientific classification
- Kingdom: Plantae
- Clade: Tracheophytes
- Clade: Angiosperms
- Clade: Monocots
- Clade: Commelinids
- Order: Poales
- Family: Bromeliaceae
- Genus: Tillandsia
- Subgenus: Tillandsia subg. Diaphoranthema
- Species: T. caliginosa

Binomial name
- Tillandsia caliginosa W. Till

Species of plant

Tillandsia caliginosa is a plant species in the genus Tillandsia. This species is native to Argentina and Bolivia
