= Tillandsia pedicellata =

Scientific classification
- Kingdom: Plantae
- Clade: Embryophytes
- Clade: Tracheophytes
- Clade: Spermatophytes
- Clade: Angiosperms
- Clade: Monocots
- Clade: Commelinids
- Order: Poales
- Family: Bromeliaceae
- Genus: Tillandsia
- Subgenus: Tillandsia subg. Diaphoranthema
- Species: T. pedicellata

Binomial name
- Tillandsia pedicellata (Mez) A.Cast.

Synonyms
- Homotypic Synonyms: Tillandsia coarctata var. pedicellata Mez

Species of flowering plant

Tillandsia pedicellata is a plant species of flowering plant in the family Bromeliaceae. This species is native to Bolivia.
