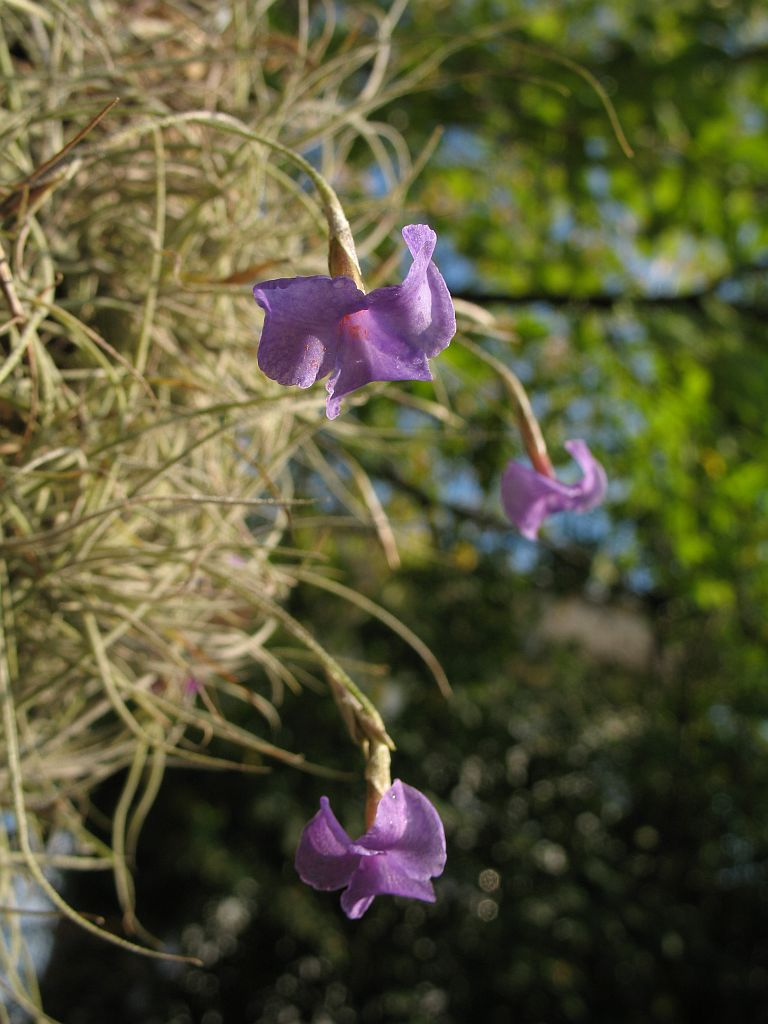

Scientific classification
- Kingdom: Plantae
- Clade: Embryophytes
- Clade: Tracheophytes
- Clade: Spermatophytes
- Clade: Angiosperms
- Clade: Monocots
- Clade: Commelinids
- Order: Poales
- Family: Bromeliaceae
- Genus: Tillandsia
- Subgenus: Tillandsia subg. Phytarrhiza
- Species: T. mallemontii

Binomial name
- Tillandsia mallemontii Glaz. ex Mez

= Tillandsia mallemontii =

Species of plant

Tillandsia mallemontii is a species of flowering plant in the family Bromeliaceae. This species is native to Brazil.

== Cultivars ==
Recognized cultivars include:

- Tillandsia 'Blue Moon'
- Tillandsia 'Kia Ora'
- Tillandsia 'Nezley'
- Tillandsia 'Van Der Mollis'
- Tillandsia 'Wo'
