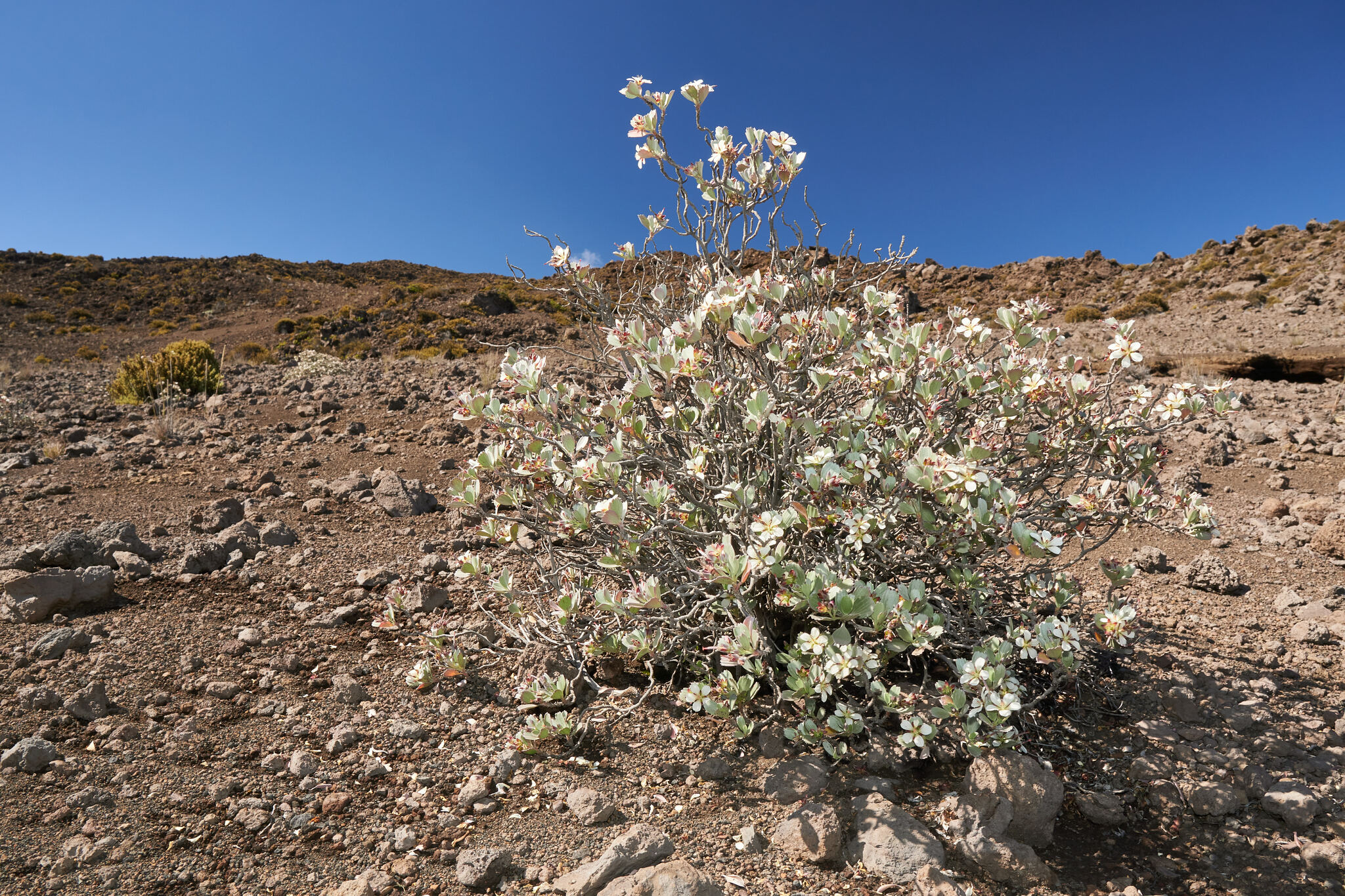
- Geranium cuneatum growing at 3200m elevation on Mauna Kea

Conservation status
- Vulnerable (NatureServe)

Scientific classification
- Kingdom: Plantae
- Clade: Tracheophytes
- Clade: Angiosperms
- Clade: Eudicots
- Clade: Rosids
- Order: Geraniales
- Family: Geraniaceae
- Genus: Geranium
- Species: G. cuneatum

Binomial name
- Geranium cuneatum Hook.

= Geranium cuneatum =

Species of geranium

Geranium cuneatum, or silver geranium, is a medium alpine shrub endemic to the islands of Hawai'i and Maui, where it grows in high elevation shrubland near or above the treeline. Like other geraniums native to Hawai'i, it is known as hinahina in Hawaiian.

== Taxonomy ==
Four varieties of G. cuneatum have been described, one of which is found only on the higher slopes of Haleakalā.

== Description ==
Geranium cuneatum is a many-branched shrub growing 30–100 cm high. Leaves are green or gray and are covered with small hairs for reflecting sunlight. Flowers are white, sometimes with purple veins.

== Distribution and habitat ==
Geranium cuneatum is endemic to high elevations on the slopes of the volcanoes Mauna Kea, Mauna Loa, Hualālai, and Haleakalā. It is frequently encountered above the tree line and grows up to at least 3200m elevation on Mauna Kea and Haleakalā.
