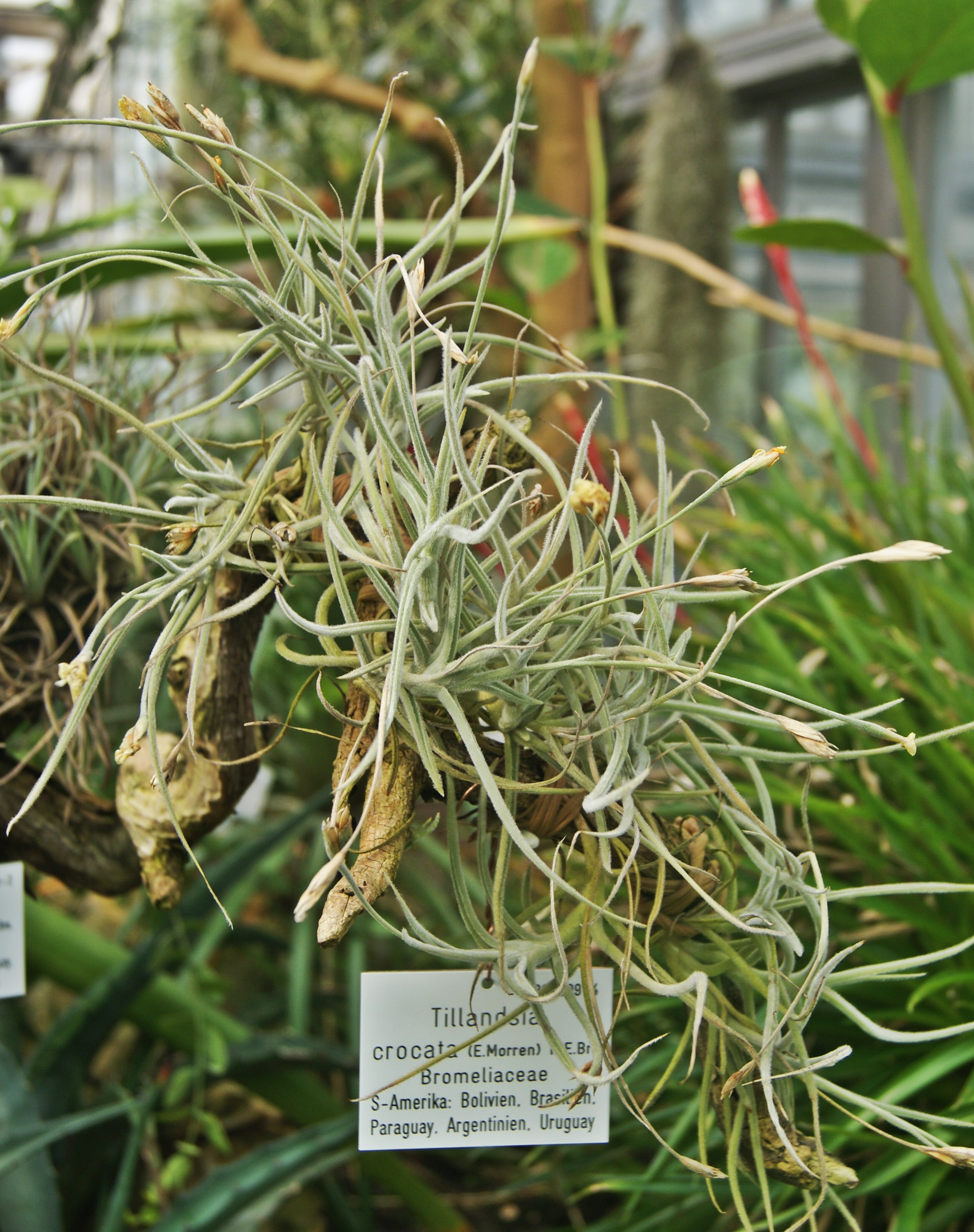

Scientific classification
- Kingdom: Plantae
- Clade: Tracheophytes
- Clade: Angiosperms
- Clade: Monocots
- Clade: Commelinids
- Order: Poales
- Family: Bromeliaceae
- Genus: Tillandsia
- Subgenus: Tillandsia subg. Diaphoranthema
- Species: T. crocata

Binomial name
- Tillandsia crocata (É.Morren) N.E.Br.

Synonyms
- Phytarrhiza crocata E.Morren; Tillandsia mandonii E.Morren ex Mez

= Tillandsia crocata =

Species of plant

Tillandsia crocata is a species in the genus Tillandsia. This species is native to Brazil, Bolivia, Argentina, Paraguay and Uruguay.

== Cultivars ==
- Tillandsia 'Rutschmann's Orange'
- Tillandsia 'Tawny Yellow'
