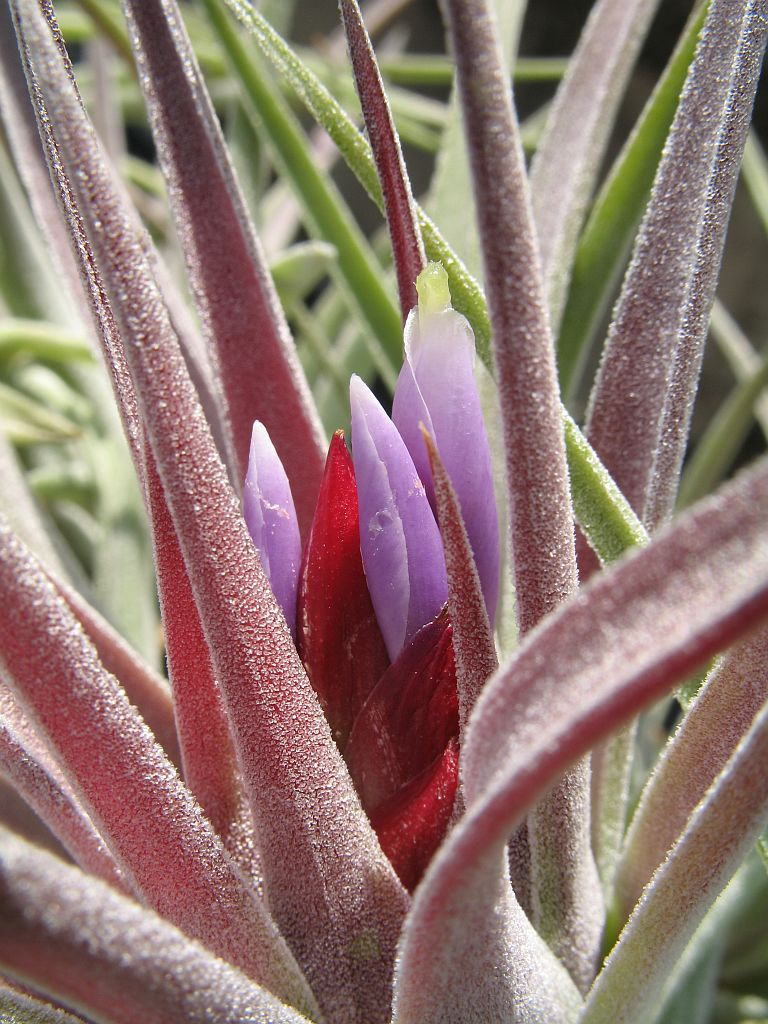
- Tillandsia kammii in cultivation at the Botanical Garden of Heidelberg, Germany

Conservation status
- CITES Appendix II (CITES)

Scientific classification
- Kingdom: Plantae
- Clade: Tracheophytes
- Clade: Angiosperms
- Clade: Monocots
- Clade: Commelinids
- Order: Poales
- Family: Bromeliaceae
- Genus: Tillandsia
- Subgenus: Tillandsia subg. Tillandsia
- Species: T. kammii

Binomial name
- Tillandsia kammii Rauh

= Tillandsia kammii =

Species of plant

Tillandsia kammii is a species in the genus Tillandsia that is native to Honduras, but has also been collected in El Salvador. It was first discovered in Honduras in 1977 in the regions of Olancho, Lempira and Copan. Its common name is Kamm's tillandsia.

== Description ==
Tillandsia kammii is a xerophytic epiphyte. It is one of only four species of Tillandsia that is protected by the CITES Appendix II. T. kammii has densely arranged leaves and often grows between five and ten centimeters tall. It has thin wiry roots and has been known to grow both as a single plant and in clusters. This plant has a short, bright red inflorescence, surrounded by violet petals, that rarely lasts more than a day after blooming. Unsurprisingly, this plant has a rough texture and appearance which is due to coarse trichomes covering its leaves. Tillandsia kammii closely resembles both T. velutina and T. plagiotropica. It is differentiated from the former by its larger, denser trichomes, and from the latter by its narrower, longer, and more flexible leaves.

== Habitat ==
Tillandsia kammii inhabits the tropical savanna climate in Honduras and El Salvador at elevations of 500 to 1200 m. Average temperatures in its habitat range from 14 °C – 35 °C, with an average total annual precipitation of roughly 1400 mm.

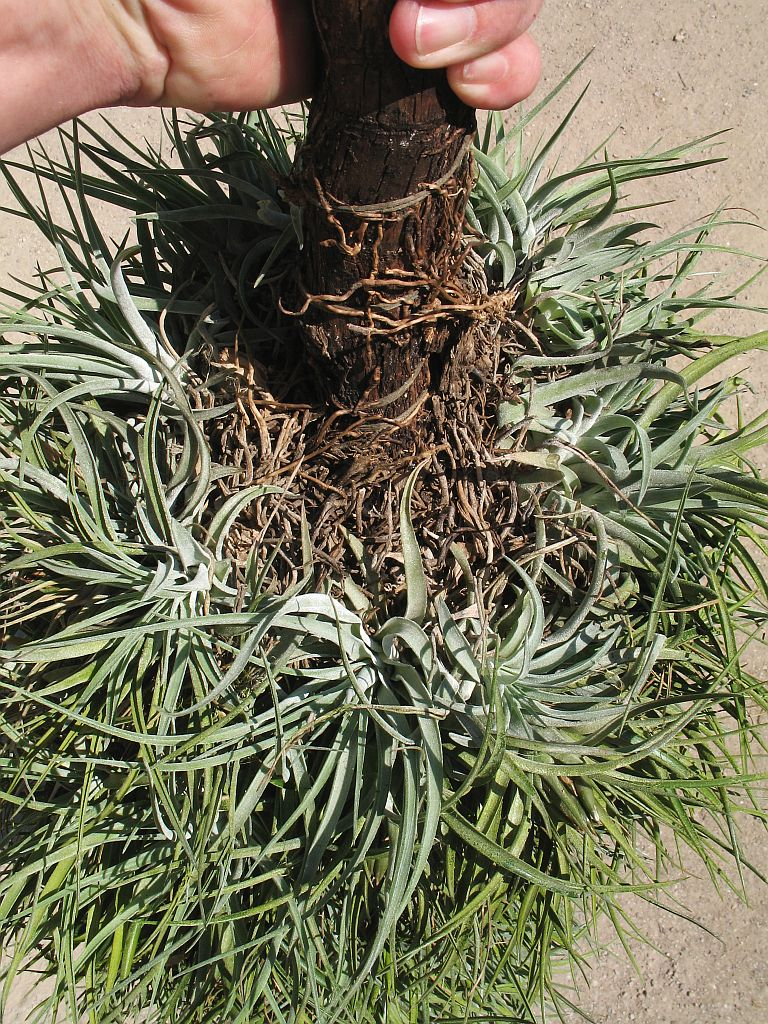
T. kammii clump at the Botanical Garden of Heidelberg, Germany.

== Cultivars ==
No cultivars are listed for this species in the BSI Cultivar Registry.
