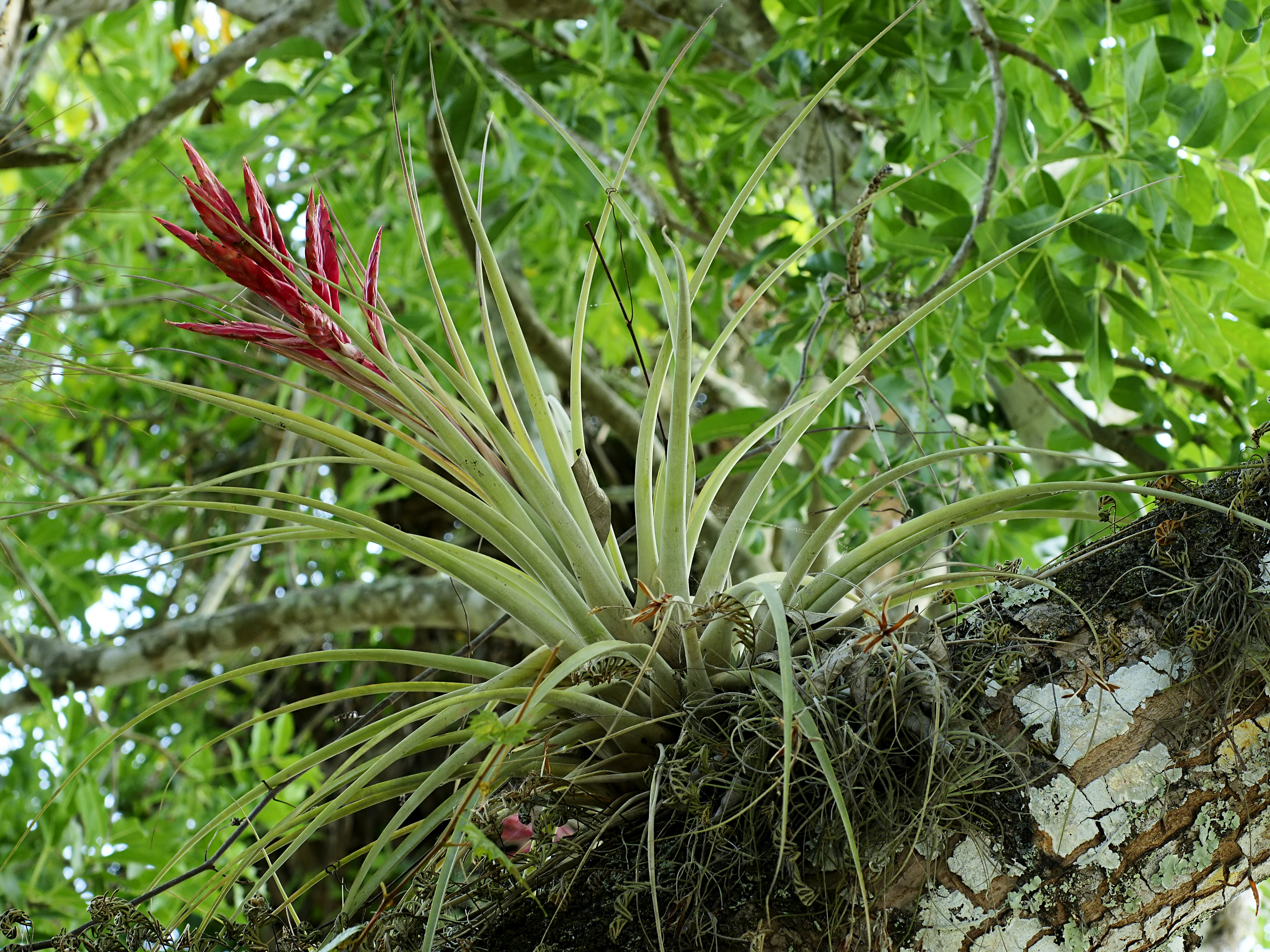
- Tillandsia fasciculata

Scientific classification
- Kingdom: Plantae
- Clade: Tracheophytes
- Clade: Angiosperms
- Clade: Monocots
- Clade: Commelinids
- Order: Poales
- Family: Bromeliaceae
- Subfamily: Tillandsioideae
- Genus: Tillandsia; L.

Species
- Over 650 species

Synonyms
- Acanthospora Spreng.; Allardtia; Diaphoranthema Beer; Phytarrhiza Vis.; Pityrophyllum Beer; Platystachys K.Koch; Racinaea M.A.Spencer & L.B.Sm.; ×Racindsia Takiz.; Renealmia L.; Strepsia Steud.; Viridantha Espejo; Wallisia (Regel) E.Morren

= Tillandsia =

Genus of flowering plants

Tillandsia is a genus of around 650 species of evergreen, perennial flowering plants in the family Bromeliaceae, native to the forests, mountains and deserts of the Neotropics, from northern Mexico and the southeastern United States to Mesoamerica and the Caribbean to central Argentina. Their leaves, more or less silvery in color, are covered with specialized cells (trichomes) capable of rapidly absorbing water that gathers on them.

They are also commonly known as air plants because they obtain nutrients and water from the air, not needing soil for nourishment. They have a natural propensity to cling to whatever surfaces are readily available: telephone wires, tree branches, bark, bare rocks, etc. Their light seeds and a silky parachute facilitate their spread. Most Tillandsia species are epiphytes – which translates to 'upon a plant'. Some are aerophytes, which have a minimal root system and grow on shifting desert soil. Due to their epiphytic way of life, these plants will not grow in soil but live on the branches of trees, in deserts and on other substrates that will not be saturated with water for very long.

== Description ==
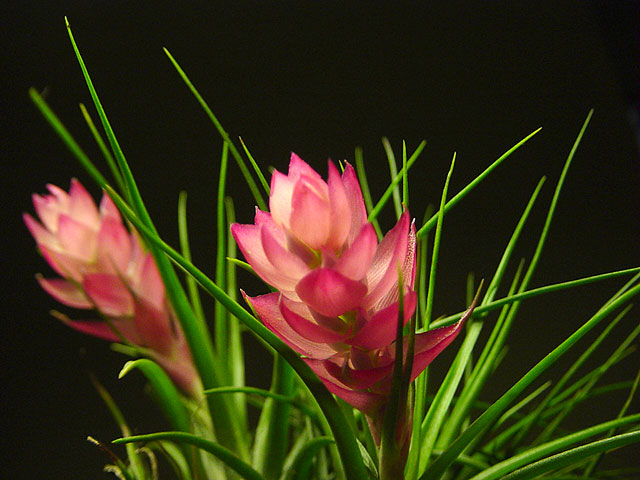
Tillandsia stricta

Tillandsia are perennial herbaceous plants which exhibit a multitude of physiological and morphological differences making this a diverse genus. Having native habitats that vary from being epiphytic and lithophytic, species have certain adaptations, such as root systems designed to anchor to other plants or substrates, and modified trichomes for water and nutrient intake. Some of the species, like the majority of Bromeliaceae, grow as funnel bromeliads, with a compressed stem axis. The leaves are then close together in rosettes, and cover the lower areas of the leaves, forming a funnel for collecting water.

These leaf rosettes, a common physical characteristic in Tillandsia species, collect nutrients and water. The flowers typically involve bright, vibrant colors, with blooms or inflorescences produced on a stalk or several stalks. The flower's color varies greatly; red, yellow, purple and pink flowers exist in this genus, and multicolored flowers are known. The bright colors attract pollinators. An air plant's foliage may also change color when it blooms, also attracting pollinators. The hermaphrodite flowers are threefold with double perianth. The three free sepals are symmetrical and pointed. The seeds have a "parachute" similar to the dandelion.

Common pollinators of this genus include moths, hummingbirds and, more recently recognized, bats.

== Taxonomy ==
The genus Tillandsia was named by Carl Linnaeus after the Swedish physician and botanist Elias Tillandz (originally Tillander) (1640–1693). Some common types of Tillandsia include ball moss (T. recurvata) and Spanish moss (T. usneoides). The genus contains around 650 species, where 635 are considered epiphytic. Tillandsia was traditionally divided into seven subgenera:

- Tillandsia subg. Allardtia (A. Dietr) Baker
- Tillandsia subg. Anoplophytum (Beer) Baker
- Tillandsia subg. Diaphoranthema (Beer) Baker
- Tillandsia subg. Phytarrhiza (Vis.) Baker
- Tillandsia subg. Pseudalcantarea Mez, now raised to the genus Pseudalcantarea
- Tillandsia subg. Pseudo-catopsis Baker
- Tillandsia subg. Tillandsia

In a more recent (2016) classification, the following subgenera are recognized:

- Tillandsia subg. Aerobia Mez in C.DC.
- Tillandsia subg. Anoplophytum (Beer) Baker
- Tillandsia subg. Diaphoranthema (Beer) Baker
- Tillandsia subg. Phytarrhiza (Vis.) Baker
- Tillandsia subg. Pseudovriesea Barfuss & W.Till
- Tillandsia L. subg. Tillandsia
- Tillandsia subg. Viridantha (Espejo) W.Till & Barfuss

Four species are protected under CITES II:

- Tillandsia harrisii
- Tillandsia kammii
- Tillandsia mauryana
- Tillandsia xerographica

== Range ==
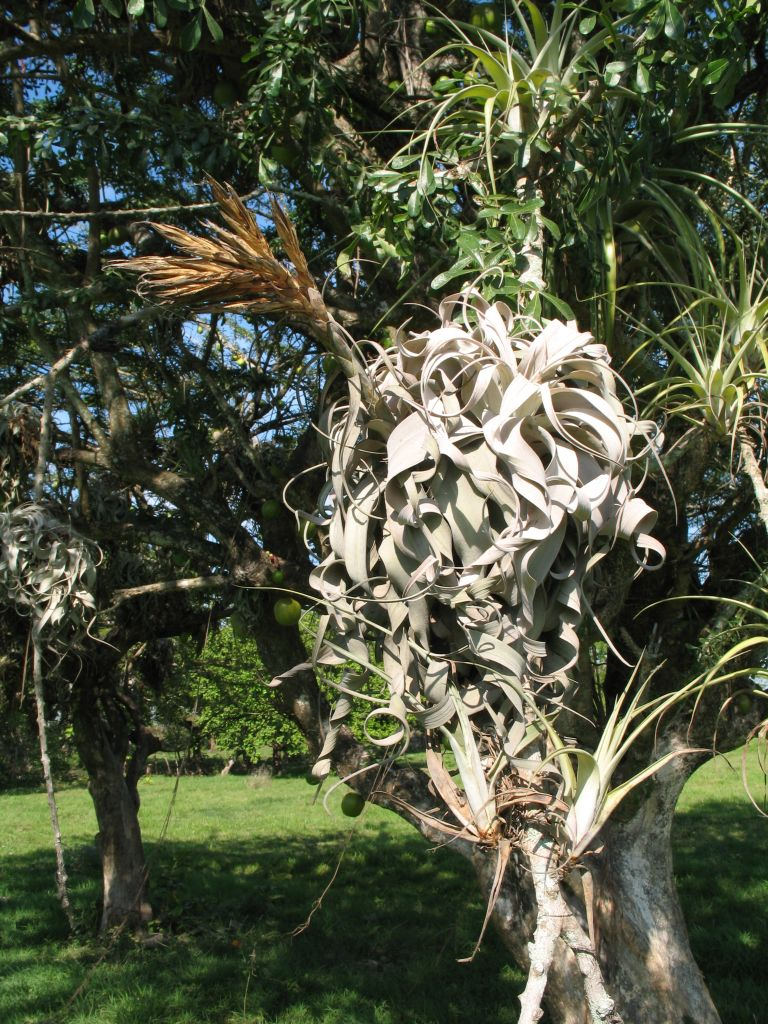
Tillandsia xerographica in its natural habitat in El Salvador near Los Cobanos beach

Tillandsia have naturally been established in diverse environments such as equatorial tropical rain forests, high elevation Andes mountains, rock dwelling (saxicolous) regions, and Louisiana swamps, such as Spanish moss (T. usneoides), a species that grows atop tree limbs. However, there are also species that are lithophytic (growing in or on rocks, though this can also stretch to living on roofs or even telephone wires). Its native range is Tropical & Subtropical America.

Green-leaved species of Tillandsia generally live in cool-to-humid climates, in areas of terrestrial shade or the lower levels of a forest. In contrast, almost all gray-leaved species live in precipitation-poor areas with high humidity. They prefer the full sun and can therefore be found in the upper floors of the woods, on rocks or (rarely) on the ground. Many of the gray species are epiphytes. Some species are more or less xeromorphic.

== Ecology ==
Species of Tillandsia photosynthesize through a process called CAM cycle, where they close their stomata during the day to prevent water loss and open them at night to fix carbon dioxide and release oxygen. This allows them to preserve water, necessary because they are epiphytes. They do not have a functional root system and instead absorb water in small amounts through their leaves via small structures called trichomes. Species of Tillandsia also absorb their nutrients from debris and dust in the air. Due to this survival mechanism, plants without roots can absorb fog droplets as well as rainwater and thus cover their water needs.

Any root system found on Tillandsia has grown to act as a fragile stabilizing scaffold to grip the surface they grow on. As soon as they have been soaked with water, the green assimilation tissue below the suction scales becomes visible again; the plant is therefore "greened" and can absorb more light. When the sun dries the plants, they turn white.

More than one-third of a tropical forest's vascular plants are epiphytes which species of Tillandsia are part of. Their contribution to the environment's carrying capacity allows for terrestrial fauna like earthworms to thrive in the treetops.

Temperature is not critical, the range being from 10 to 32 °C (50 to 90 °F). Frost hardiness depends on the species. T. usneoides, for example, can tolerate night-time frosts down to about −10 °C (14 °F). For most species, the ideal growth temperature is between 20 and 25 °C (68 and 77 °F), with a minimum of 10 °C (50 °F) and a maximum of 30 °C (86 °F). Few are resistant to −10 °C (14 °F), but some, usually from higher elevation areas, are hardy enough to withstand light and brief freezes and live outdoors year round in areas with mild winters.

== Cultivation ==
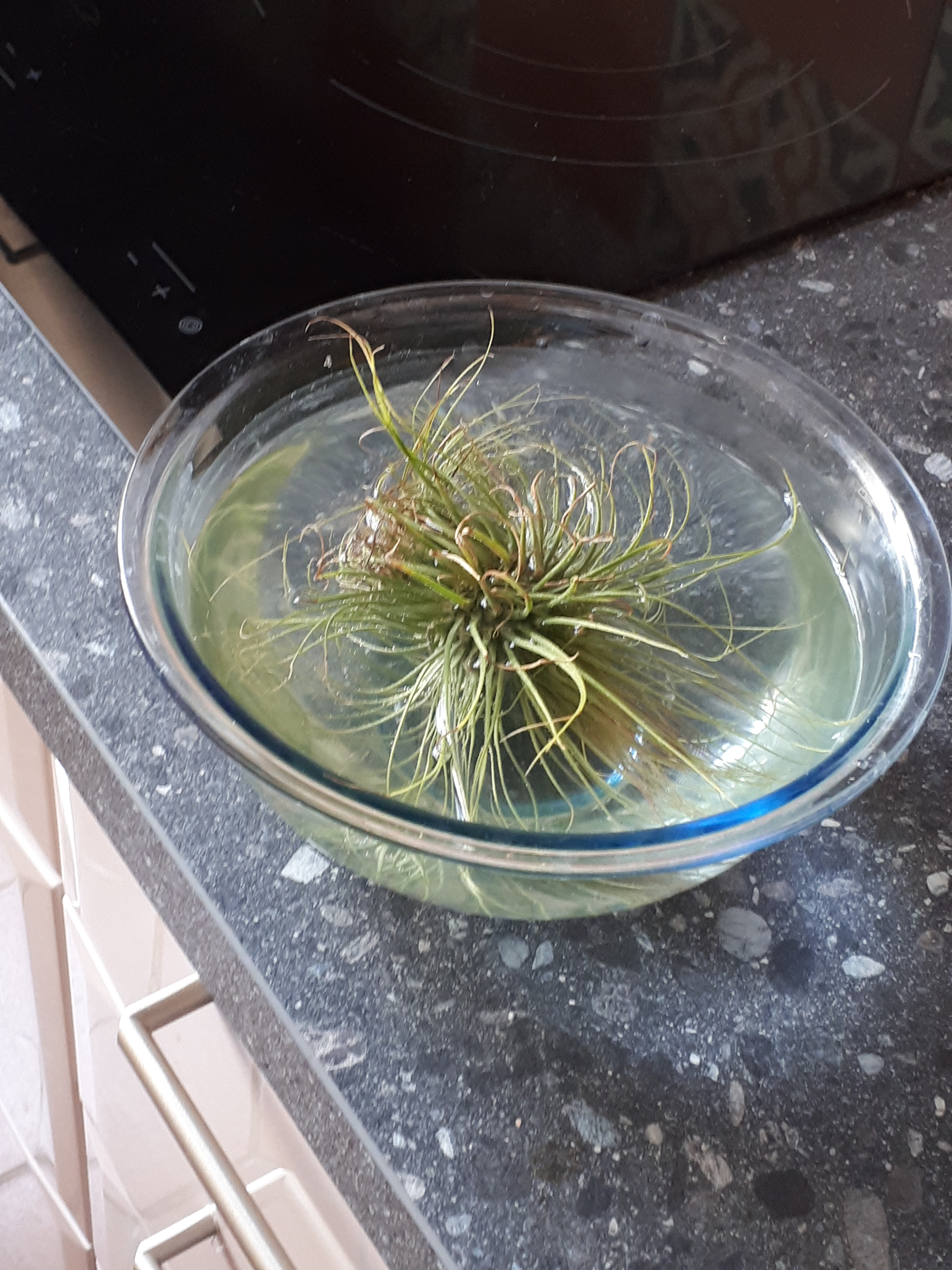
Bathing Tillandsia

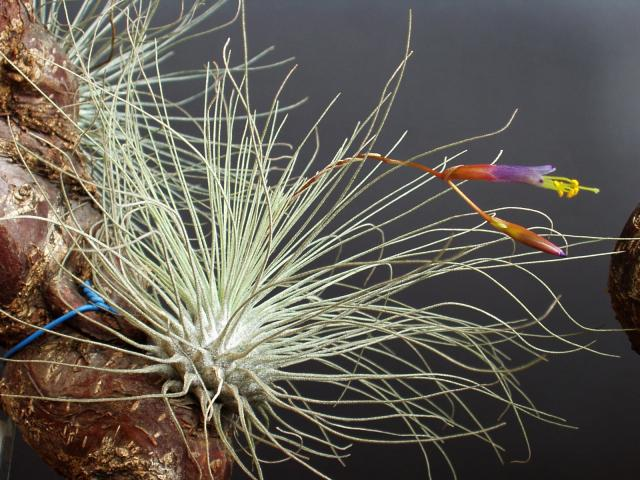
Tillandsia argentea

Tillandsias, like other bromeliads, can multiply through pollination and seed formation. Since Tillandsia are not self-fertile, the pollen must come from another plant of the same species. Tillandsia, depending on the species, may take months or years to flower. After flowering, the plant forms offsets and dies.

Generally, the thinner-leafed varieties grow in rainy areas and the thick-leafed varieties in areas more subject to drought. Most species absorb moisture and nutrients through the leaves from rain, dew, dust, decaying leaves and insect matter, aided by structures called trichomes. Air plants are growing rapidly in popularity as a low maintenance household plant. Due to their minimal root system and other adaptations, they generally do not require frequent watering, no more than four times a week, allowing the plant to completely dry before watering again.

The amount of light required depends on the species; overall, air plants with silver dusting and stiff foliage will require more sunlight than air plants with softer foliage. They generally need a strong light. In summer outside, however, they prefer the light shade of a tree at the hottest hours. Plants are commonly seen mounted, placed in a terrarium, or simply placed in seashells as decorative pieces. For so-called "aerial" species (the majority of the common species in culture except Tillandsia cyanea), that is to say those whose roots are transformed into crampons without any power of absorption, watering is done by the leaves in the form of frequent sprays, or brief soaking of the plant in a container full of water. Non-calcareous water is recommended.

As of 2023 there are 34 cultivars of bromeliad registered by Bromeliad Society International, from T. Bacchus to T. Yabba.

== Gallery ==
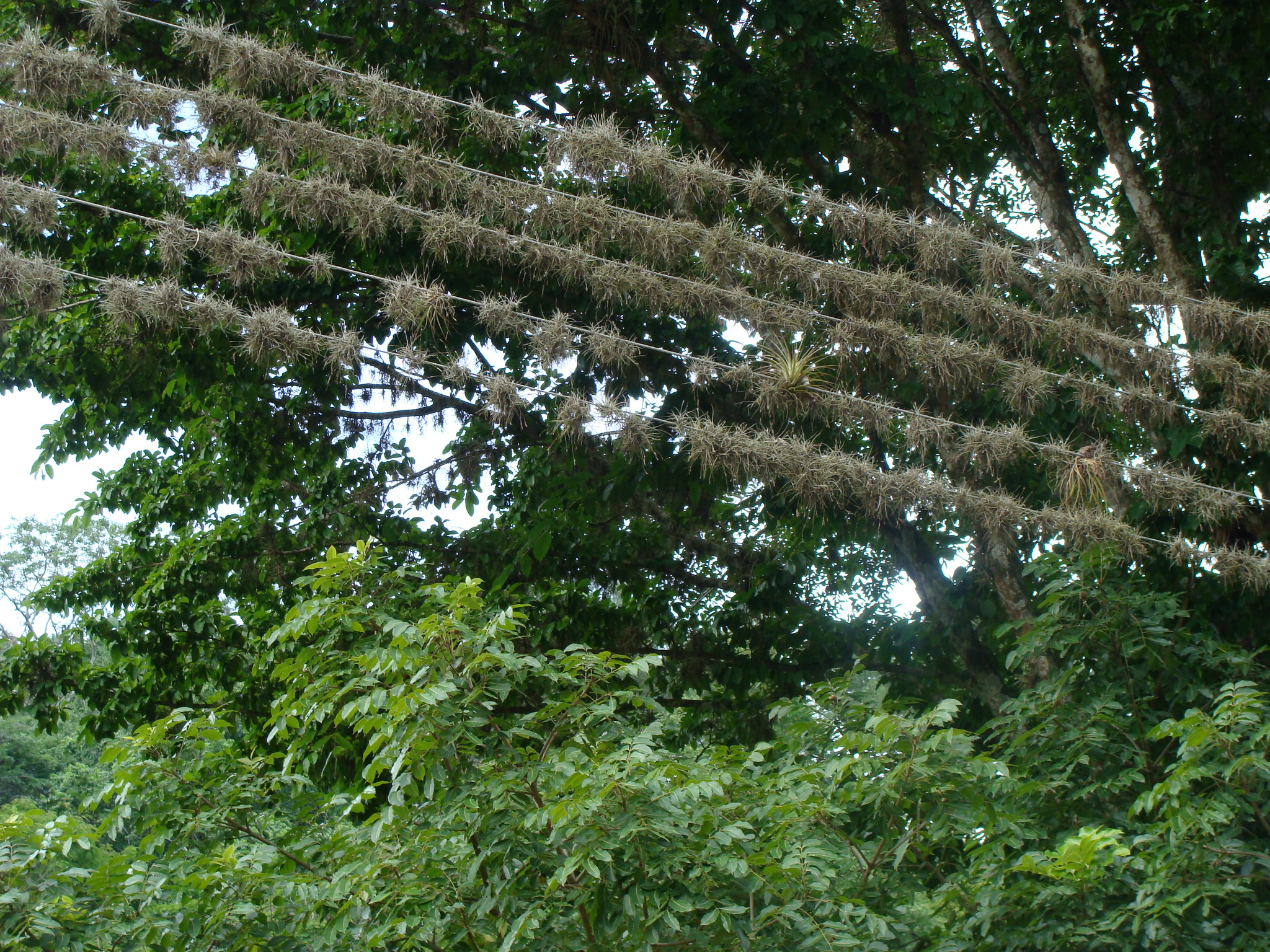
Tillandsia recurvata and another Bromeliaceae species on electric wires near San Juan de los Morros, Venezuela

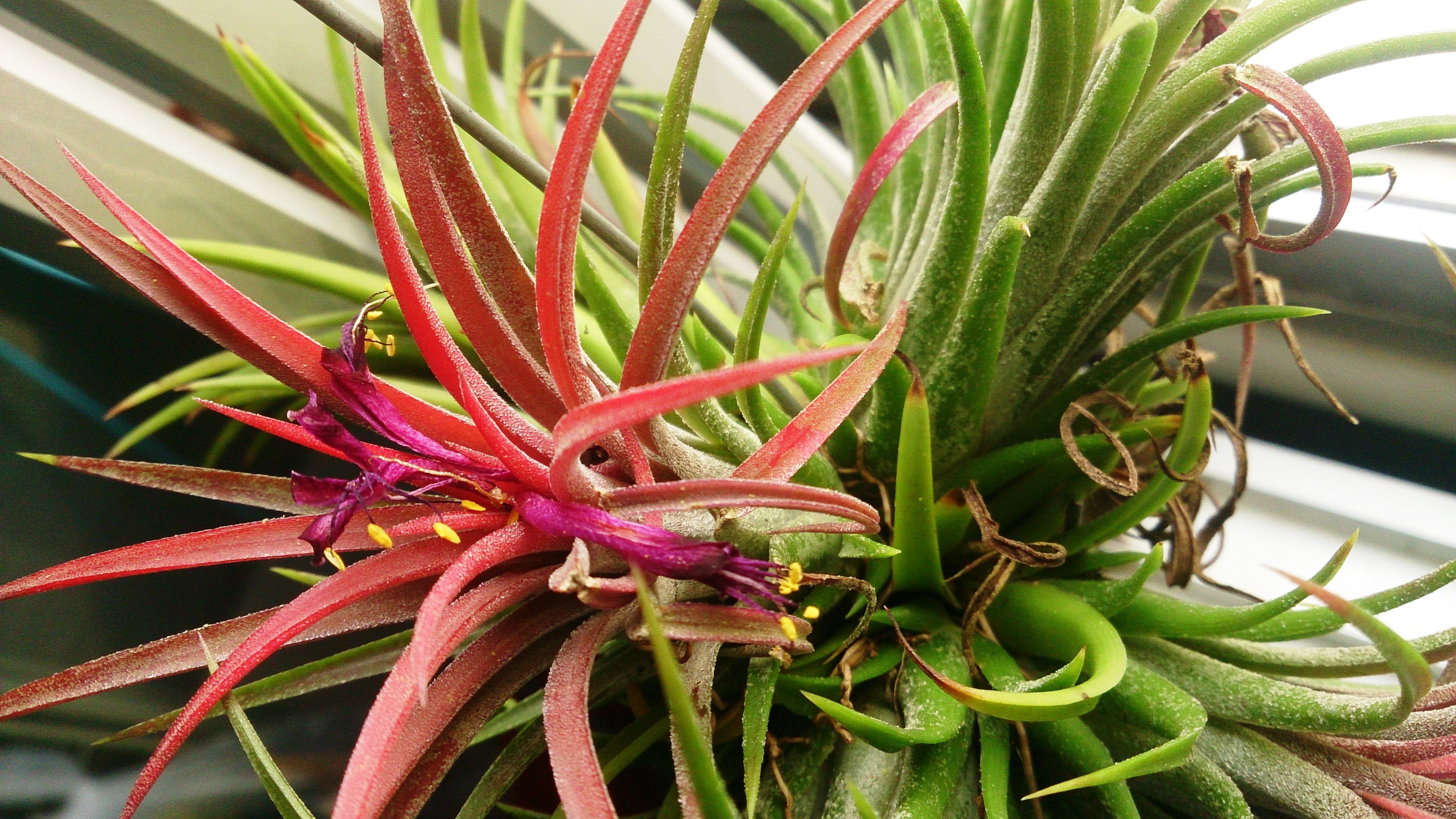
Tillandsia ionantha with bright-coloured foliage during full bloom. Some foliage has a light, silver dusting which can be easily scratched off

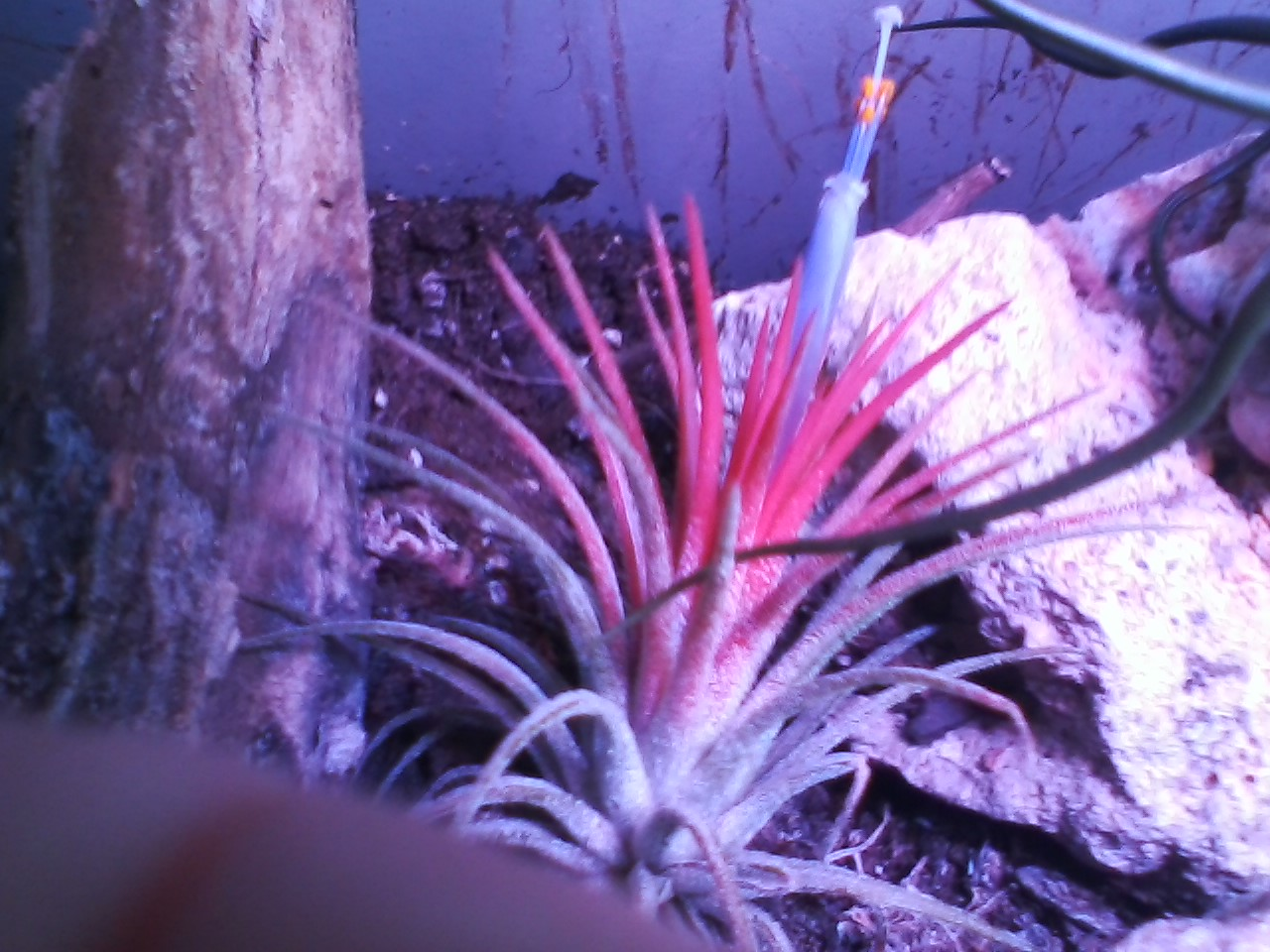
Tillandsia ionantha in bloom

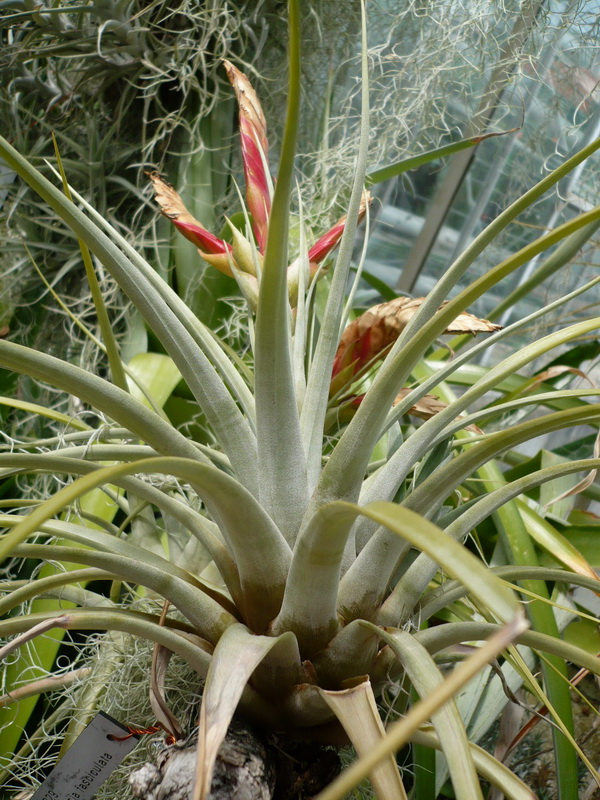
Tillandsia fasciculata

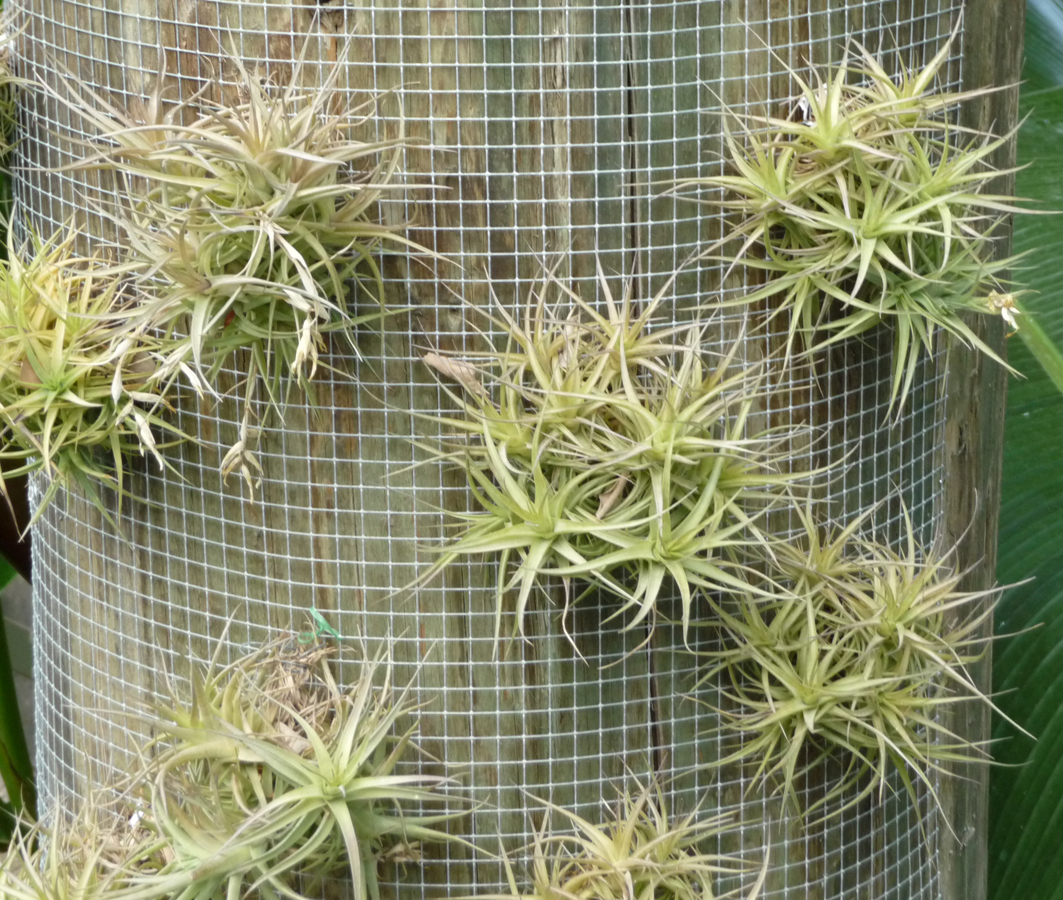
Tillandsia bergeri

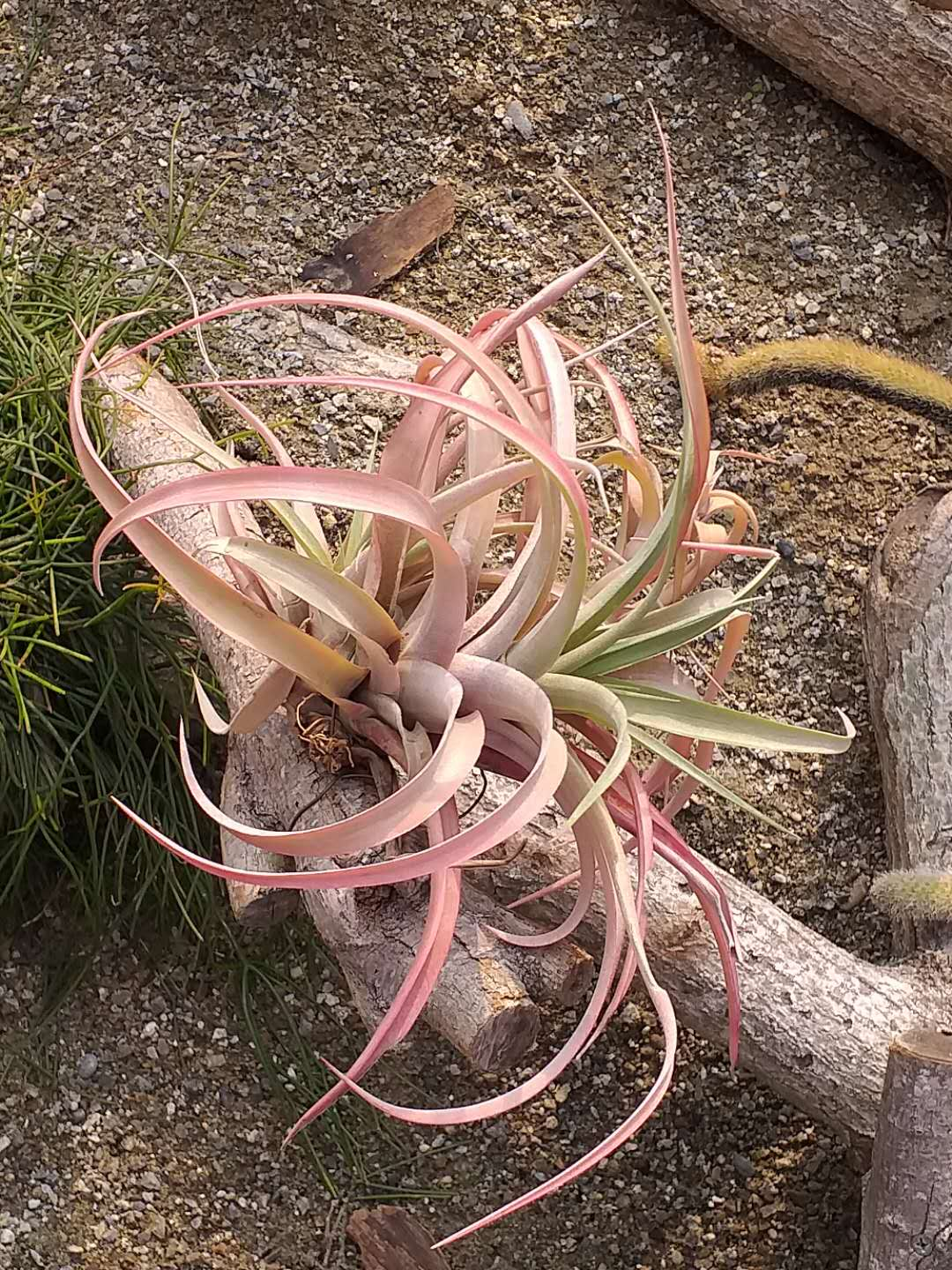
Tillandsia, 2018 Taichung World Flora Exposition, Taiwan

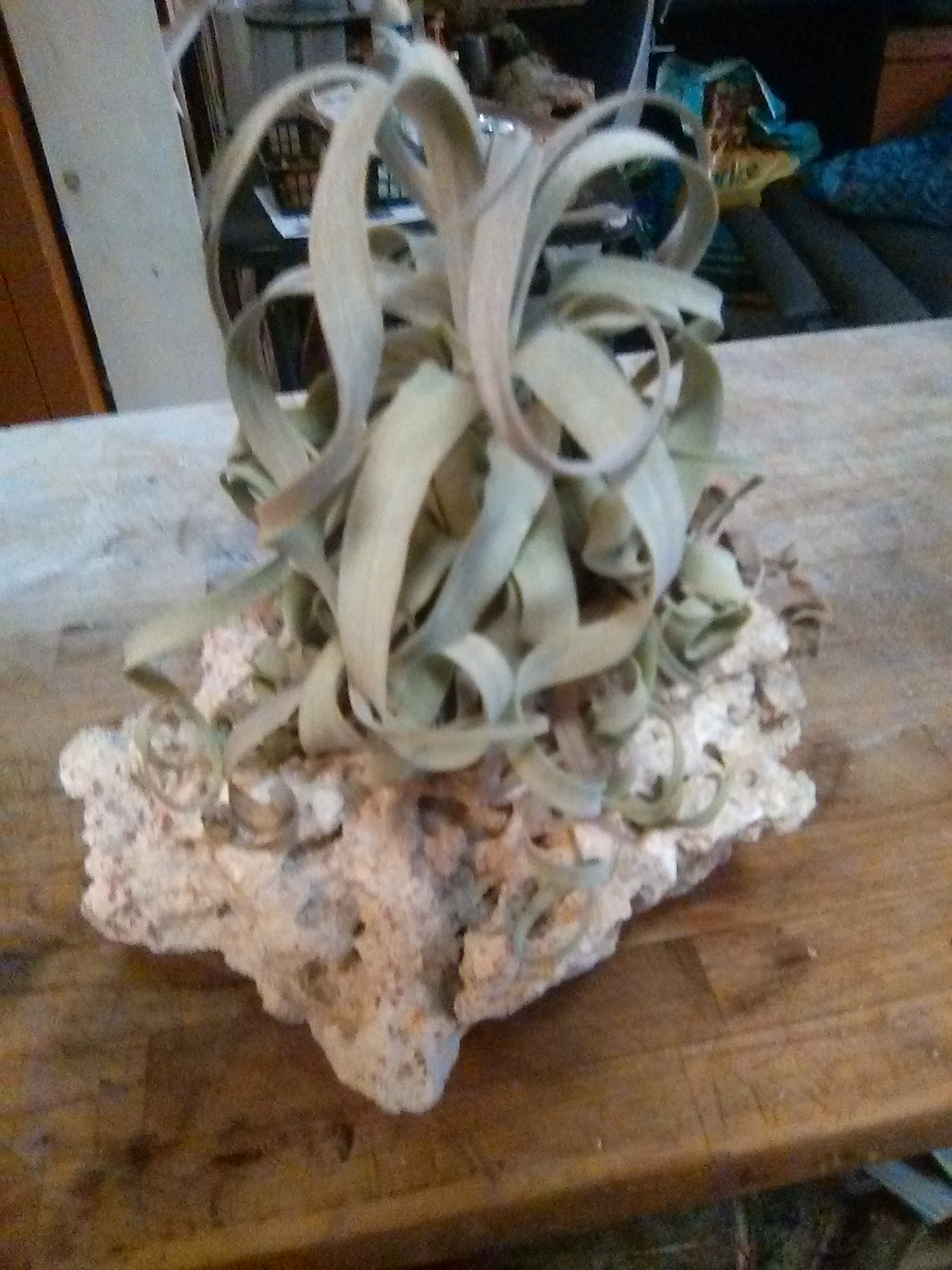
Tillandsia streptophylla growing on a limestone rock

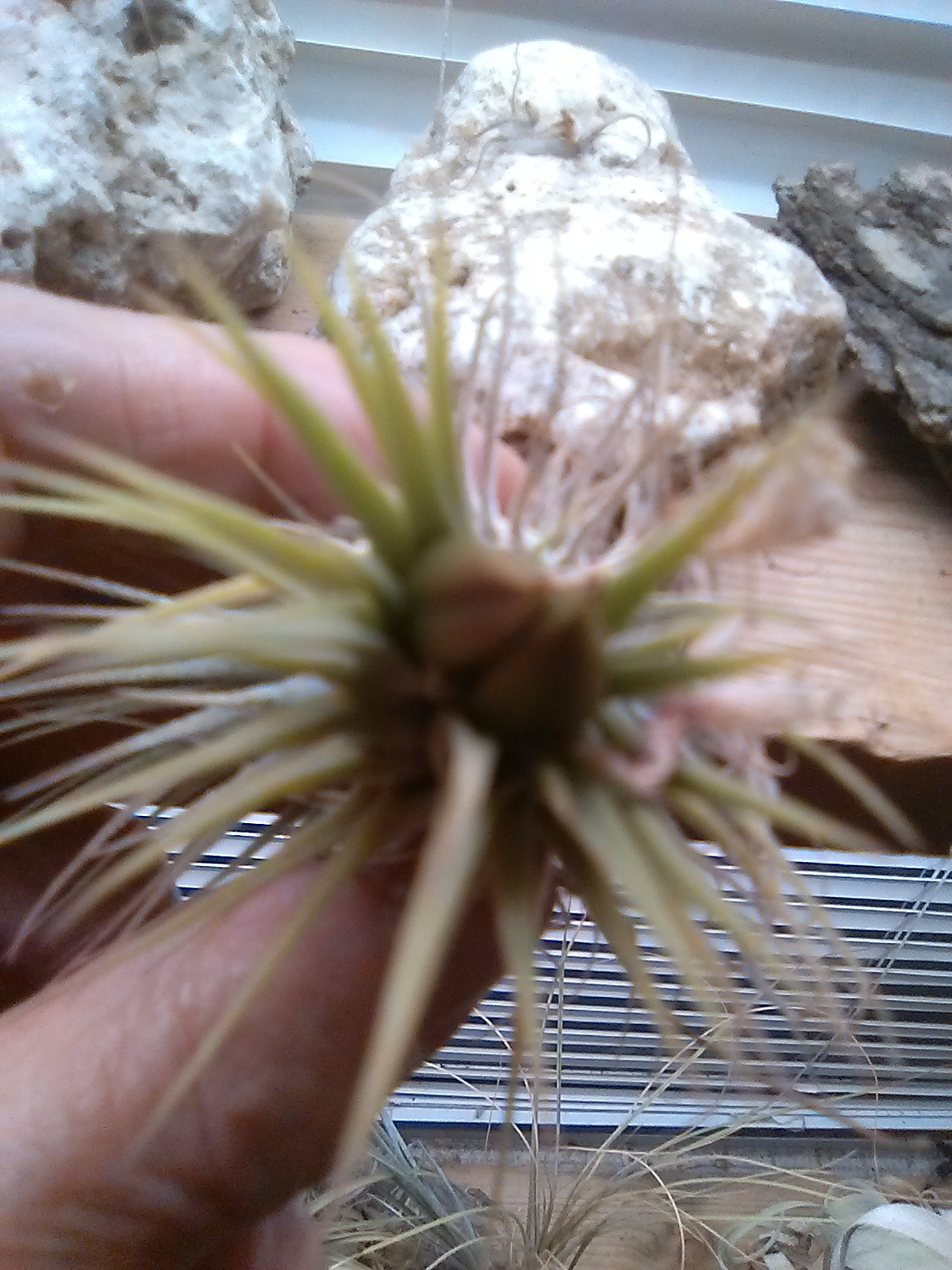
Seed pods on T. ionantha in the center of the rosette

A small pup emerging from the base of a budding Tillandsia plant.
