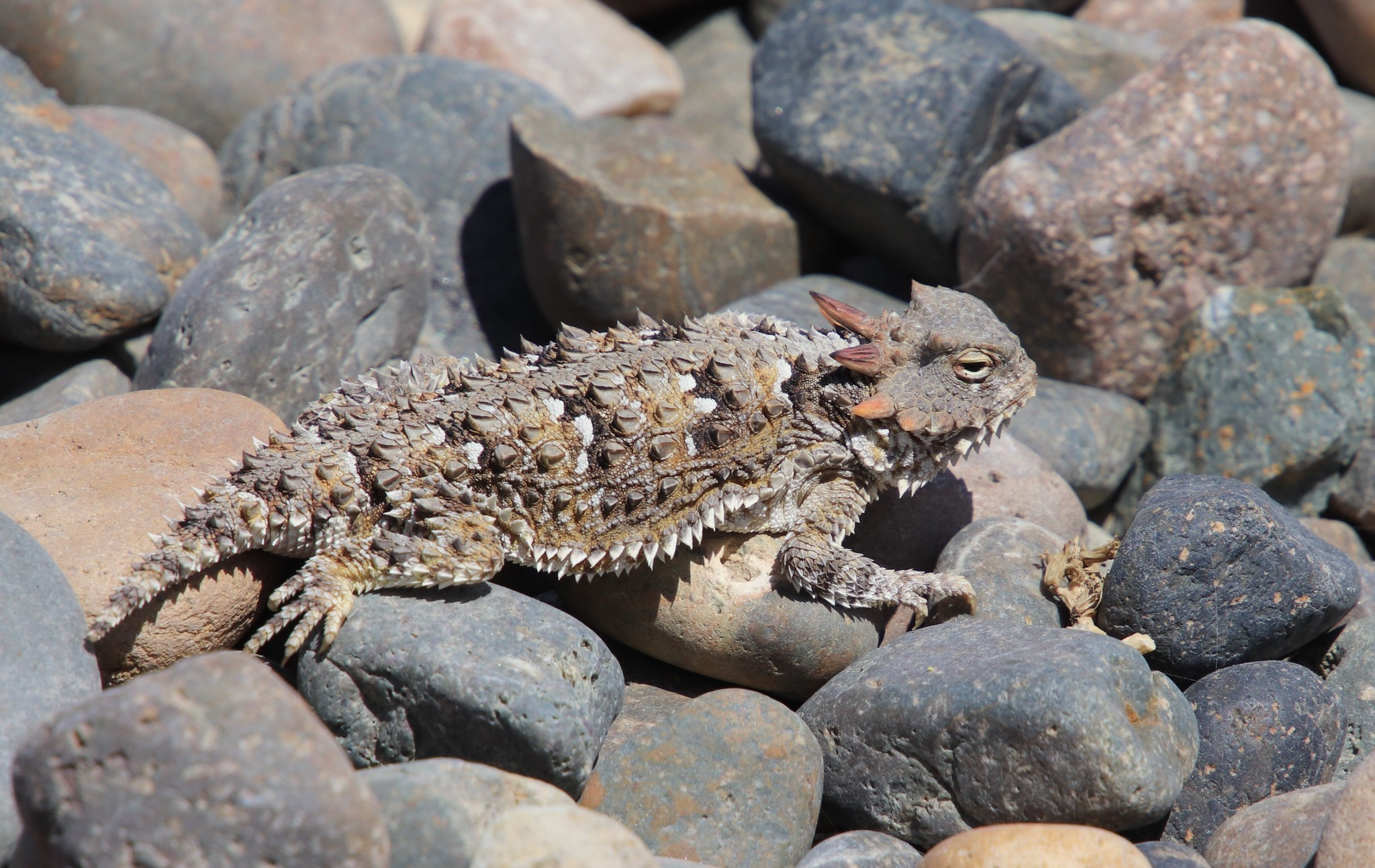

Conservation status
- Least Concern (IUCN 3.1)
- CITES Appendix II

Scientific classification
- Kingdom: Animalia
- Phylum: Chordata
- Class: Reptilia
- Order: Squamata
- Suborder: Iguania
- Family: Phrynosomatidae
- Genus: Phrynosoma
- Species: P. blainvillii

Binomial name
- Phrynosoma blainvillii Gray, 1839

Synonyms
- Phrynosoma coronatum blainvillii

= San Diego horned lizard =

Species of phrynosomatid lizard

The San Diego horned lizard or Blainville's horned lizard (Phrynosoma blainvillii) is a species of phrynosomatid lizard native to southern and central California in the United States and northern Baja California in Mexico. As of 2016, the this species is considered a priority 2 California species of special concern.

== Taxonomy ==
Described as a distinct species by John Edward Gray in 1839 (being named after Henri Marie Ducrotay de Blainville), it was later reclassified as a subspecies of the coast horned lizard (P. coronatum) in 1933. However, studies by Adam Leaché in 2006 and 2009 found sufficient genetic evidence to again classify P. blainvillii as a distinct species. In 2021, Gunther Köhler again reclassified blainvillii as a subspecies of P. coronatum, although the Reptile Database has not followed this.

== Distribution and habitat ==
This species ranges from the Central Valley of California south through Southern California to northern Baja California.

These lizards are usually found near mountains in areas that are sandy, with low vegetation and near ant hills. Populations of Blainsville's horned lizard have been identified at elevations ranging from 10 m (33 ft) above sea level (El Segundo Dunes, Los Angeles County) to approximately 2,130 m (6,990 ft) above sea level (Tahquitz Meadow, Riverside County).

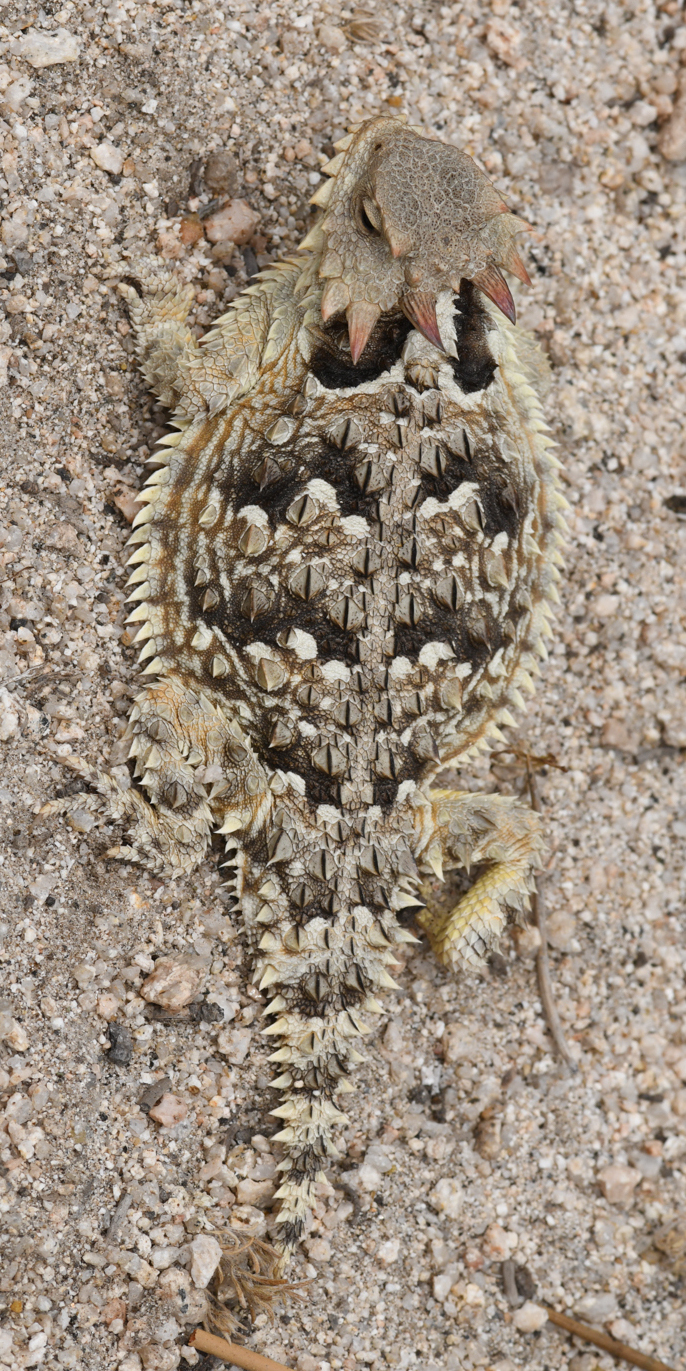
At Tulare (CA)

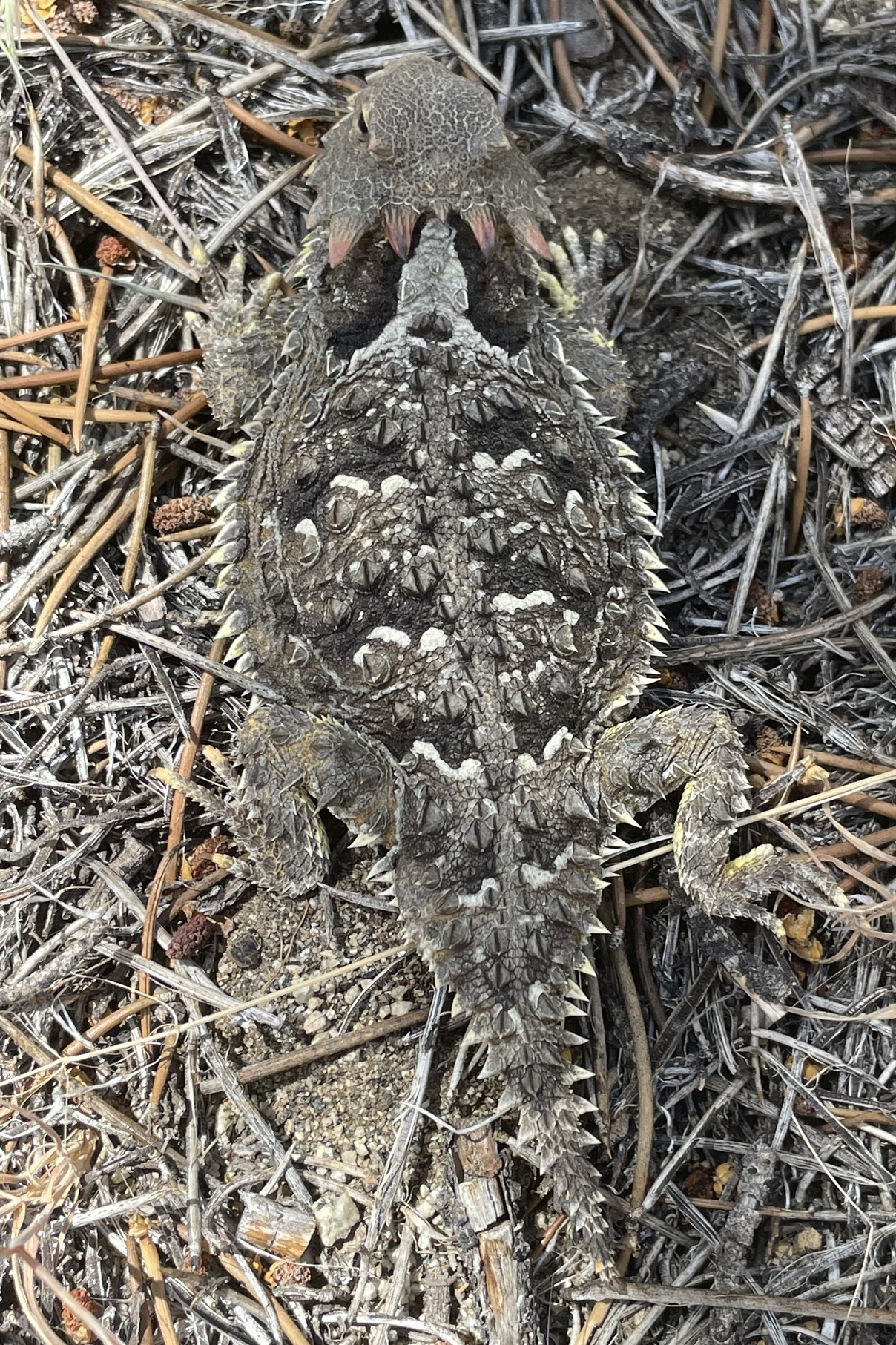
At Tulare (CA)

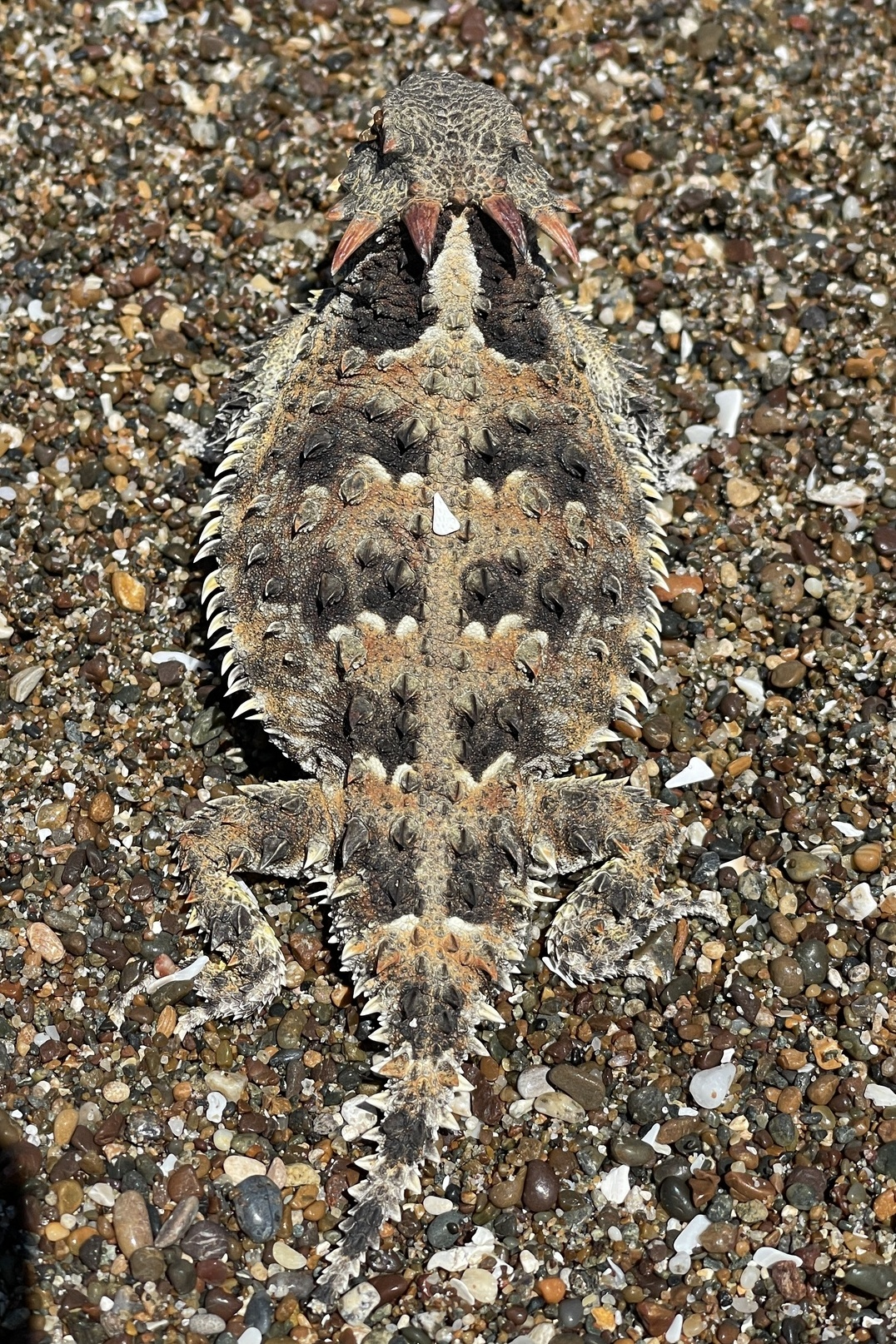
At San Luis Obispo (CA)

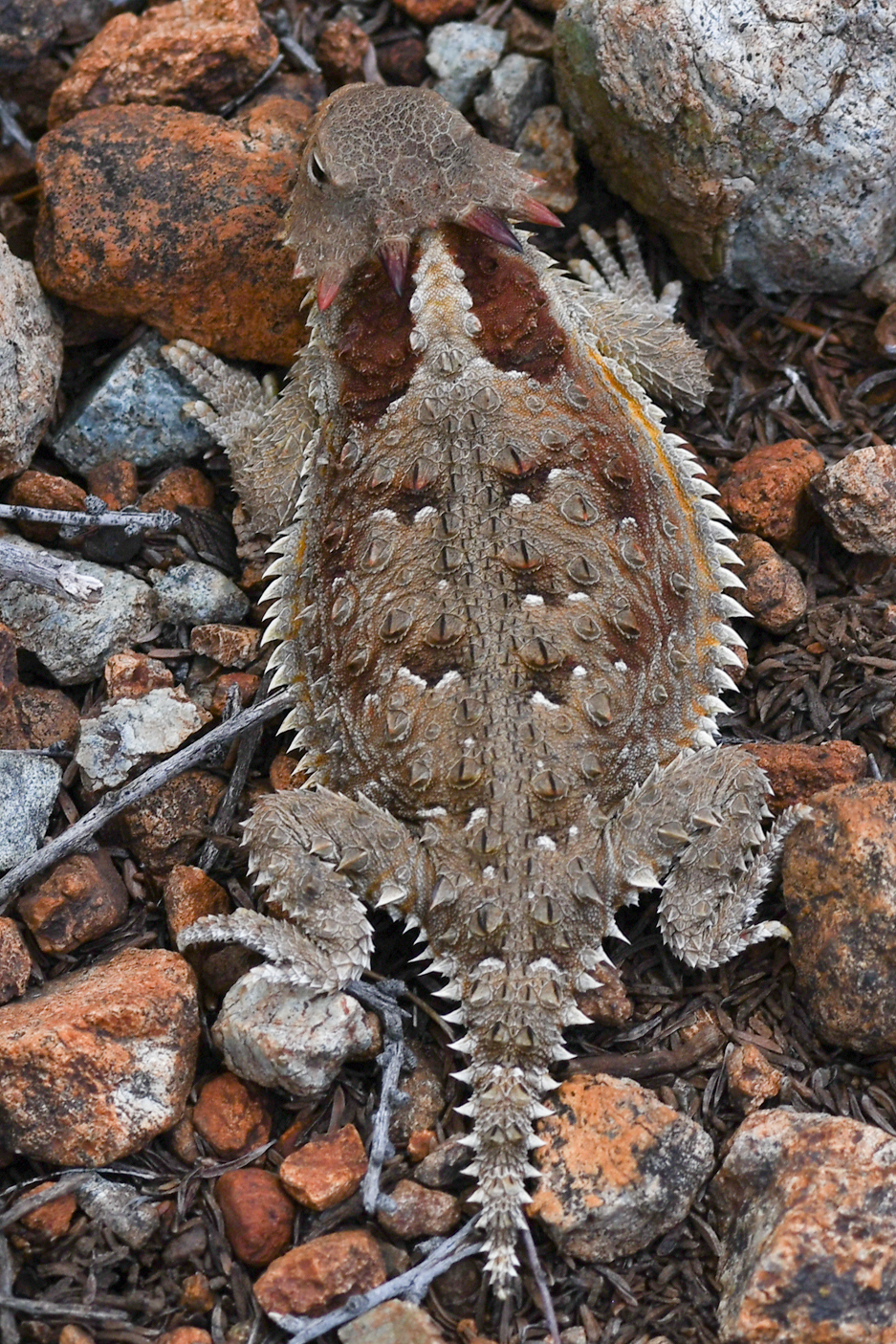
At San Benito (CA)

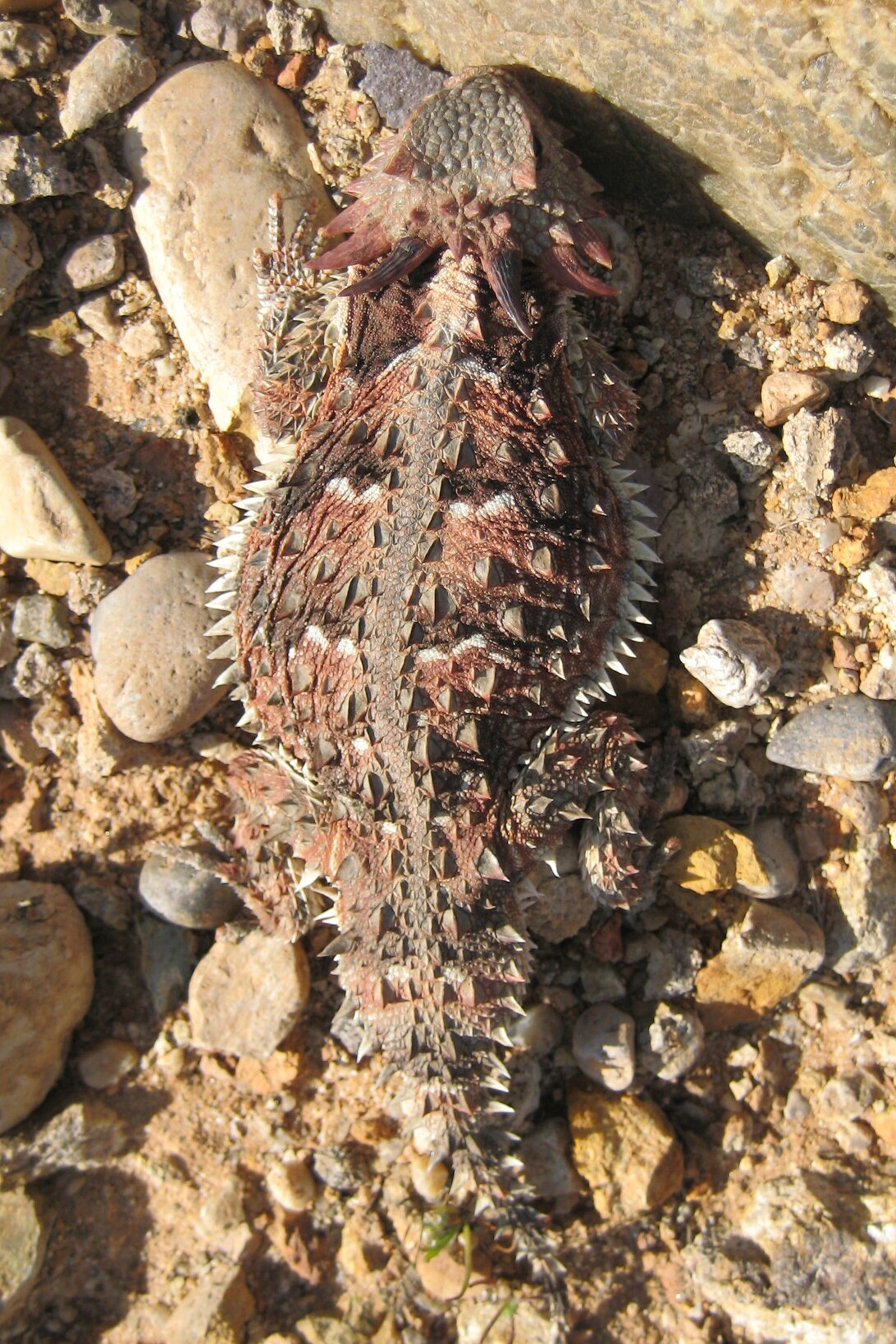
At San Diego (CA)

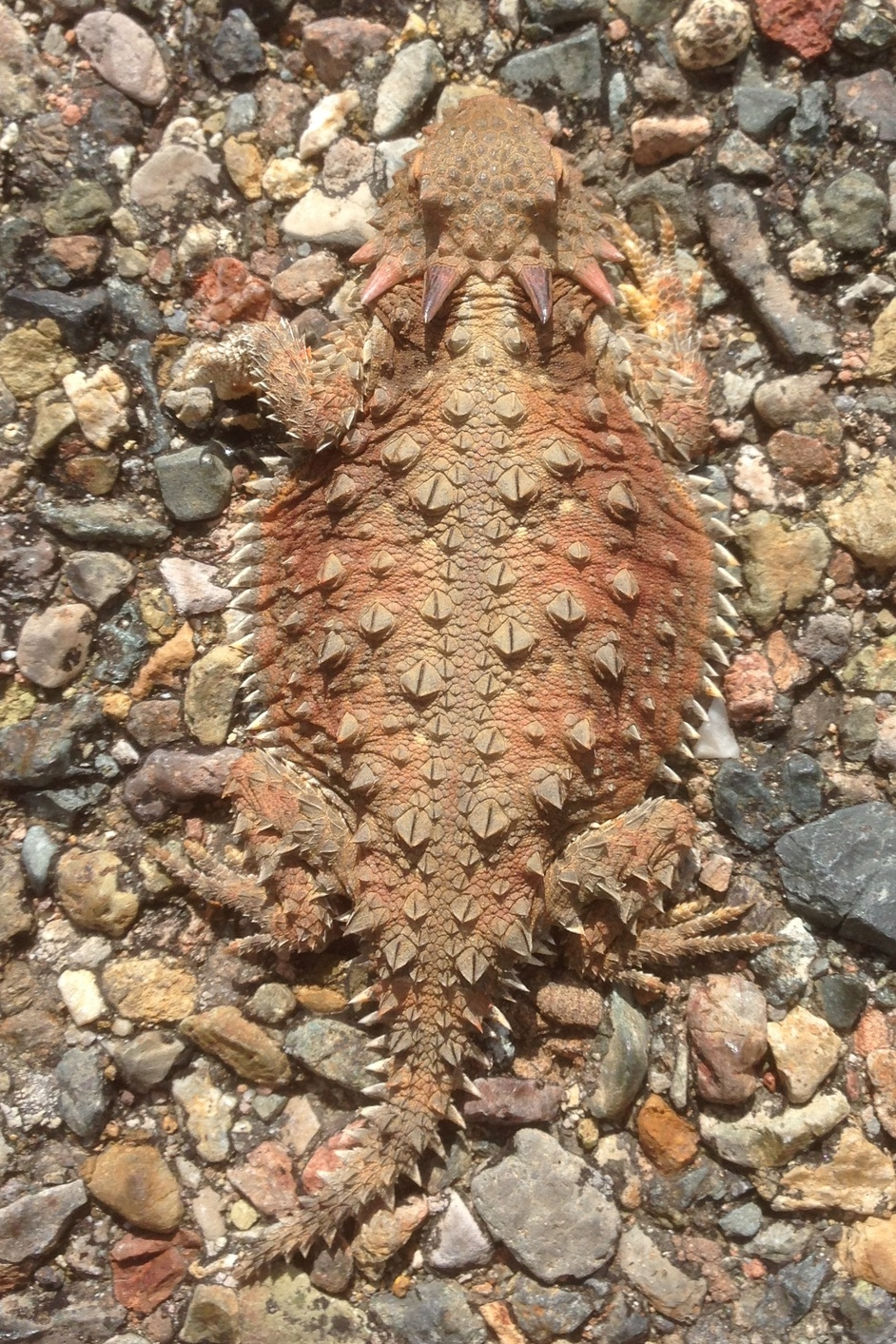
At Baja California (Mexico)

== Description ==
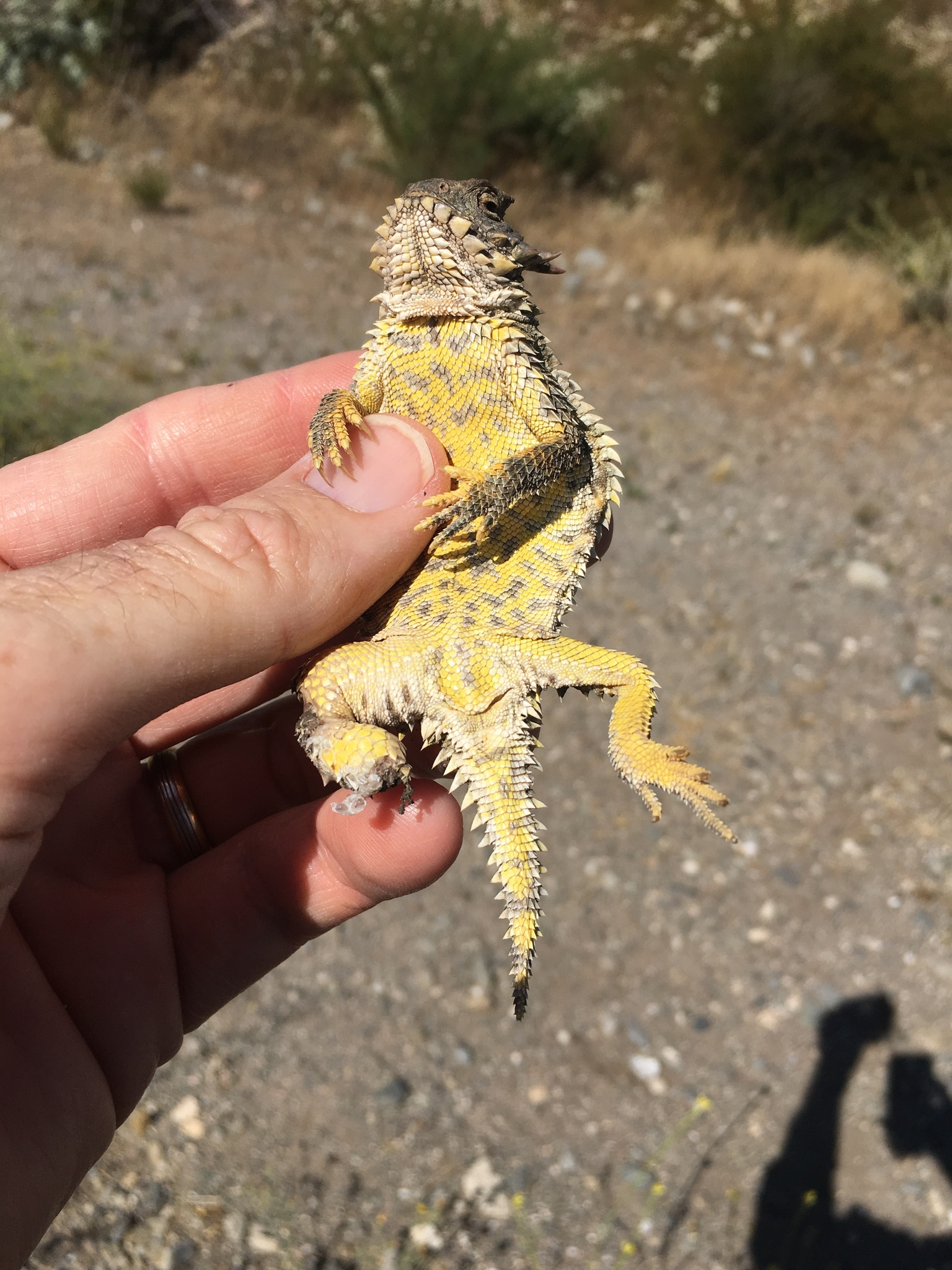
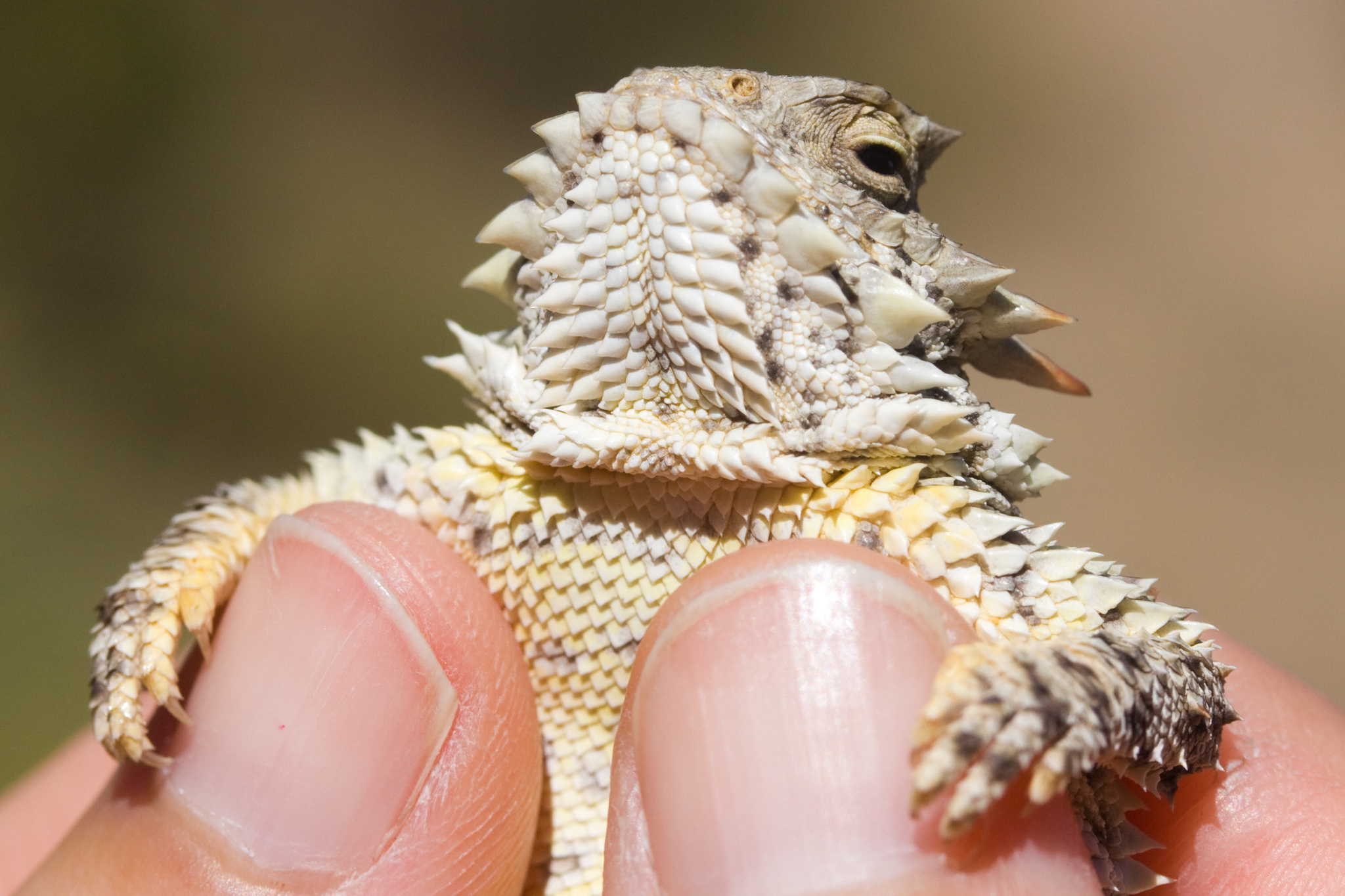
Showing the underside

The San Diego horned lizard or the Blainville's horned lizard (Phrynosoma blainvillii) is a flat bodied lizard with long spiky horns located on the top and side of its head and has smaller spikes throughout its body and tail. The length of an adult size lizard can range from 2.5 to 4.5 in (6.4 to 11.4 cm) measure from the tip of its snout to its bottom just before where the tail starts. They are either red, brown, yellow or gray in color and have several black spots on their back and neck. These lizards have highly variable dorsal coloration but it usually matches the "prevailing soil color."

The difference between males and females is that the female lizards are bigger than the males. The males also have bigger horns on the base of their tails and have noticeable pores on the interior of their hind legs.

== Biology ==
=== Defense ===
These lizards are vulnerable to a wide range of predators such as badgers, foxes, coyotes, house pets, greater roadrunners, loggerhead shrikes, American kestrels, burrowing owls, and the northern Pacific rattlesnake.

Their first defensive strategy to avoid predators is to remain still, using their body color to blend in with their surroundings. If this strategy fails, they will attempt to hide in undergrowth or cover themselves in sand. If this fails, they will try other defensive tactics such as hissing, biting, or using the horns on their heads and body as weapons. If they are out of defensive options they can shoot blood out of their eyes to scare off predators.

=== Diet ===
Their diet is mostly harvester ants, but they do eat spiders, beetles, termites, and other insects. Harvester ants require dry conditions and therefore struggle in cultivated urban ecosystems with irrigated lawns, which in turn impacts horned lizard populations.

=== Reproduction ===
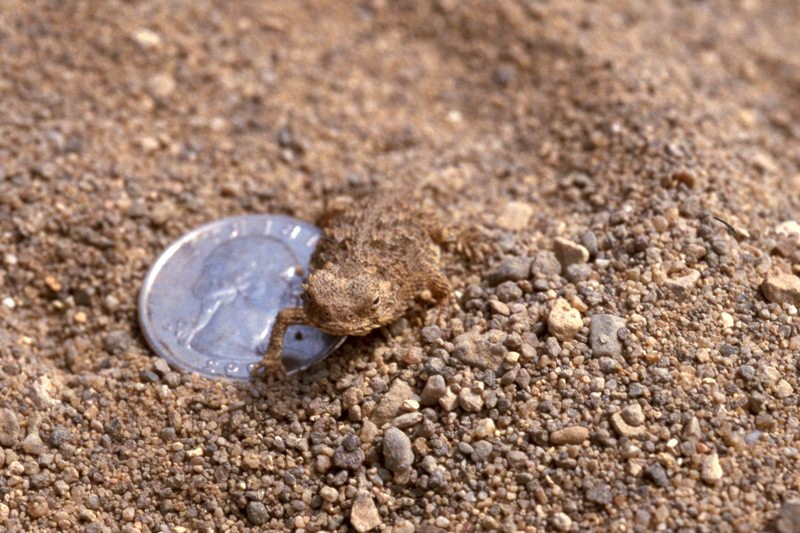
Juvenile

In Southern California, the San Diego horned lizard's reproductive period ranges from early March to June.

Each year the female Blainville's horned lizard can lay about 6–21 eggs in a year. A few months after they are laid in August–September they begin to hatch.

The females will lay their eggs in the Santa Monica and Simi Hills area.

== Conservation ==
The San Diego horned lizard is no longer present in many sections of Southern California due to urbanization, and other types of habitat loss.

The population of horned lizards are declining because of habitat loss or degradation, hunting or capturing by humans and an increase of invasive species of Argentine ants.

Between 1890 and 1910, the lizard's population was also impacted by collection for the curio trade; an estimated 115,000 California horned lizards were killed, stuffed, and sold as souvenirs.

== Sources ==
- Jennings, Mark R.; Hayes, Marc P. (1994-11-01). "SAN DIEGO HORNED LIZARD (Phrynosoma coronatum blainvillii, Gray 1839)". Amphibian and Reptile Species of Special Concern in California. Rancho Cordova, California: California Department of Fish and Game, Inland Fisheries Division. pp. 126–130.
- Thomson, Robert C.; Wright, Amber N.; Shaffer, Howard Bradley (2016). "COAST HORNED LIZARD (Phrynosoma blainvillii, Gray 1839)". California Amphibian and Reptile Species of Special Concern. California Department of Fish and Wildlife. Oakland, California: University of California Press. pp. 218–224. ISBN 978-0-520-96483-9. LCCN 2015050096. OCLC 933219171.
