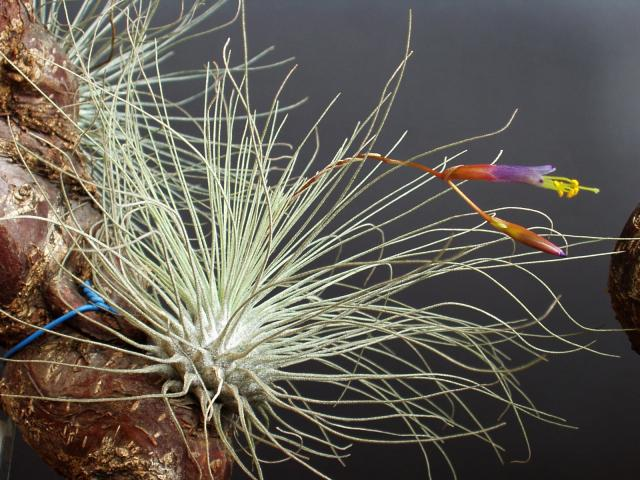
- In bloom

Scientific classification
- Kingdom: Plantae
- Clade: Embryophytes
- Clade: Tracheophytes
- Clade: Angiosperms
- Clade: Monocots
- Clade: Commelinids
- Order: Poales
- Family: Bromeliaceae
- Genus: Tillandsia
- Subgenus: Tillandsia subg. Tillandsia
- Species: T. argentea

Binomial name
- Tillandsia argentea Griseb.

= Tillandsia argentea =

Species of flowering plant

Tillandsia argentea is a species of flowering plant in the family Bromeliaceae. It is called the silver-leaved air plant. It is native to Cuba and Jamaica. An evergreen perennial epiphyte, it has gained the Royal Horticultural Society's Award of Garden Merit as a houseplant.
