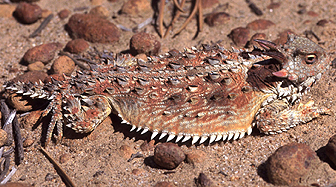

Conservation status
- Least Concern (IUCN 3.1)
- CITES Appendix II

Scientific classification
- Kingdom: Animalia
- Phylum: Chordata
- Class: Reptilia
- Order: Squamata
- Suborder: Iguania
- Family: Phrynosomatidae
- Genus: Phrynosoma
- Species: P. coronatum

Binomial name
- Phrynosoma coronatum (Blainville, 1835)

Synonyms
- Agama (Phrynosoma) coronata Blainville, 1835; Batrachosoma coronatum (Blainville, 1835)

= Coast horned lizard =

Species of lizard

The coast horned lizard (Phrynosoma coronatum) is a species of phrynosomatid lizard endemic to Baja California Sur in Mexico. As a defense the lizard can shoot high pressure streams of blood out of its eyes if threatened.

== Taxonomy ==
Phrynosoma coronatum was previously considered to be a widely divergent species with over six subspecies ranging from Baja California north to California's Sacramento Valley. In 1997 Bayard H. Brattstrom of California State University, Fullerton, Department of Biology stated that there are no subspecies of the coast horned lizard. Studying specimens from the San Diego Natural History Museum, he could not match a given lizard to a particular claimed subspecies—for example, Phrynosoma coronatum blainvillii or Phrynosoma coronatum frontale—based on characteristics the subspecies were said to have, such as size of frontal scales. Instead, the classification of the assumed subspecies seemed to be based on the site at which it was collected. Thus, Brattstrom concluded that the species has much variation but no valid subspecies.

However, a 2009 study by Adam D. Leaché et al. found sufficient genetic divergence (based on mitochondrial DNA or mtDNA) between clades to split P. coronatum into three species: P. blainvillii, P. cerroense, and P. coronatum sensu stricto. This splitting leaves P. coronatum restricted to Baja California Sur. However, in 2021 Gunther Köhler again reclassified blainvillii and cerroense as subspecies of P. coronatum, although the Reptile Database has not followed this taxonomic change.

== Description ==
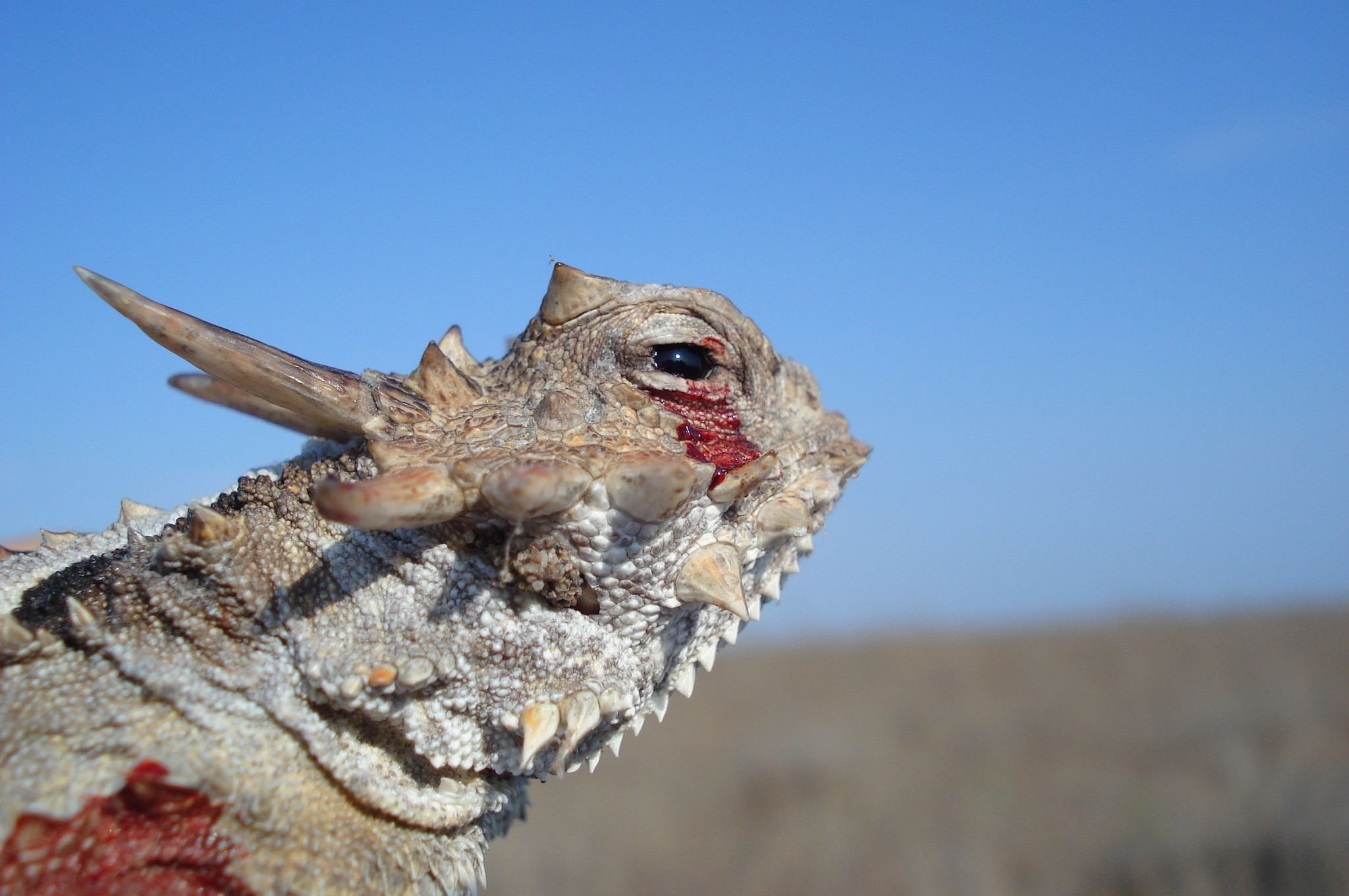
Showing blood from autohaemorrhaging

The coast horned lizard appears rough and spiky but is actually smooth-skinned, although it has sharp spikes along its sides, back and head. It is a large species, and can reach 10 cm (4 inches) excluding the tail. It is less rounded than other horned lizards. It has two large dark blotches behind its head, followed by three broad bands on its body, with several smaller bands along the tail. Its colour can be various shades of brown, with cream 'accents' around the blotches and the outer fringe of its scales.

== Variations ==
There are four different variations of coast horned lizards that share several similarities but vary in morphological characters. However, another variation, Phrynosoma wigginsi, cannot be categorized into the four other variations. This species lives in the eastern side of the Sierra de Guadalupe and Sierra de la Giganta in the central Gulf Coast region of the peninsula of Baja California.

== Habitat ==
The preferred natural habitats of Phrynosoma coronatum are desert, grassland, shrubland, and forest.

== Diet ==
Phrynosoma coronatum preys upon native species of ants.

== Reproduction ==
Phrynosoma coronatum is oviparous.

== Gallery ==
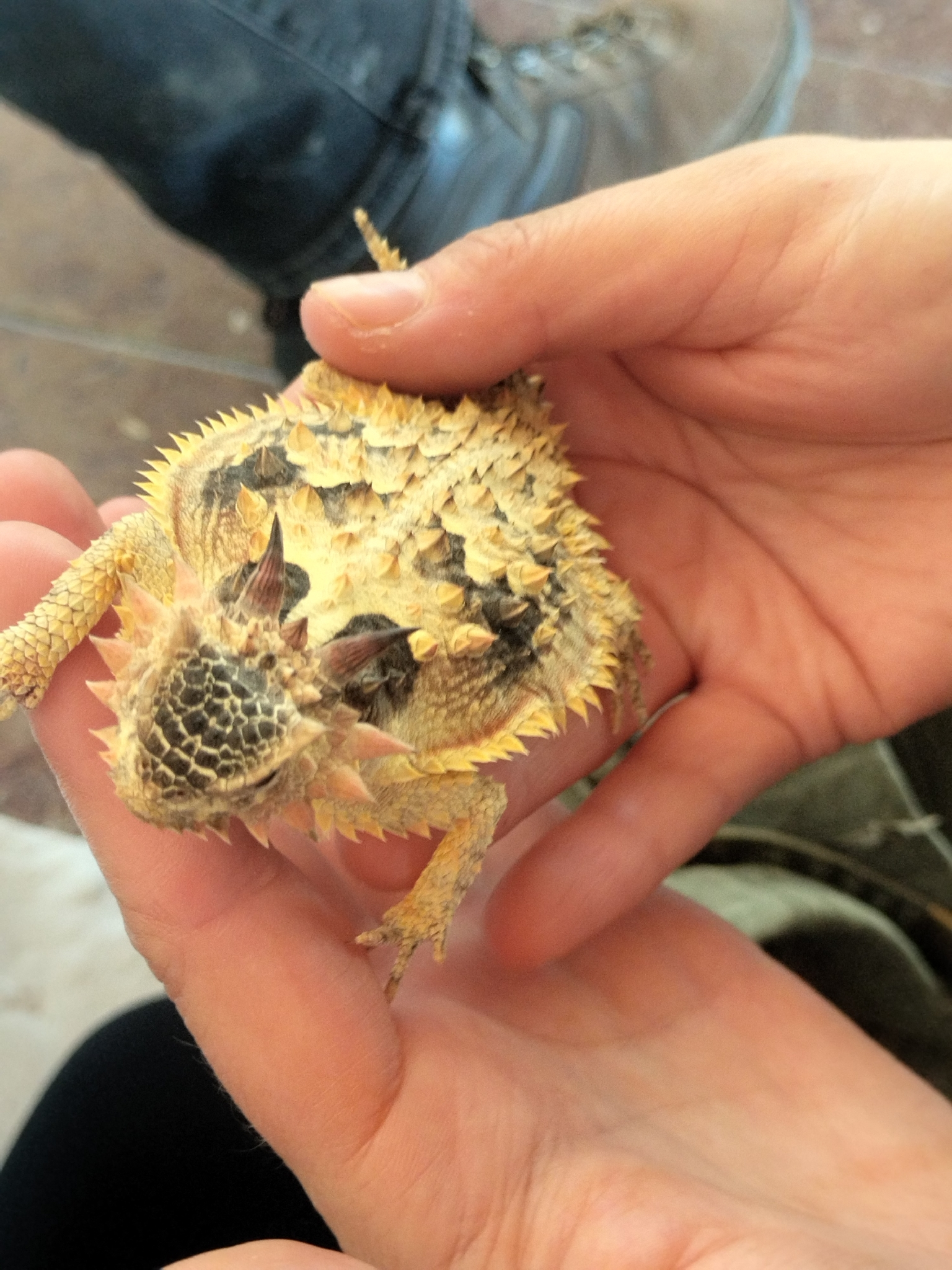
In Baja California

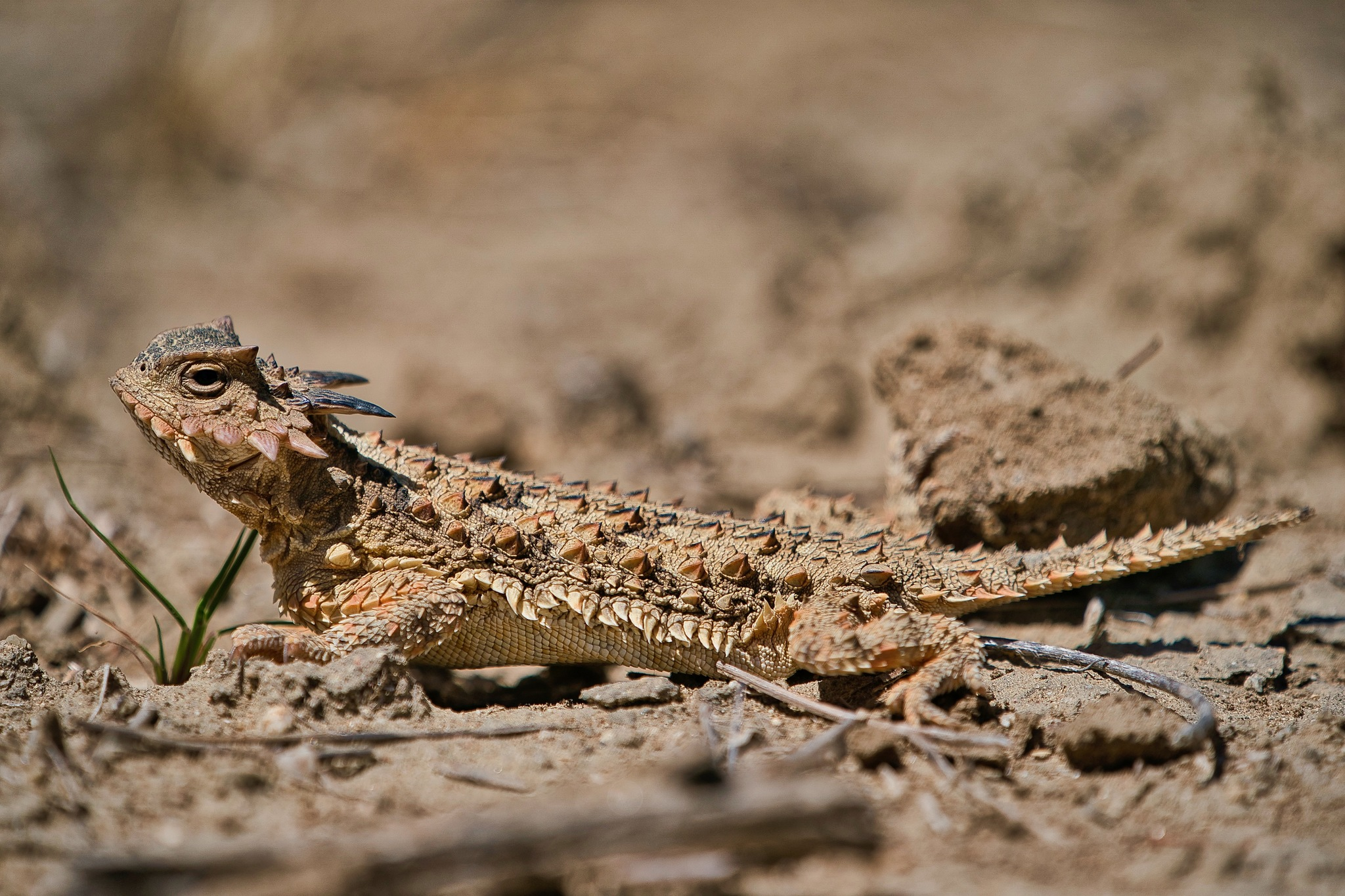
In Baja California Sur

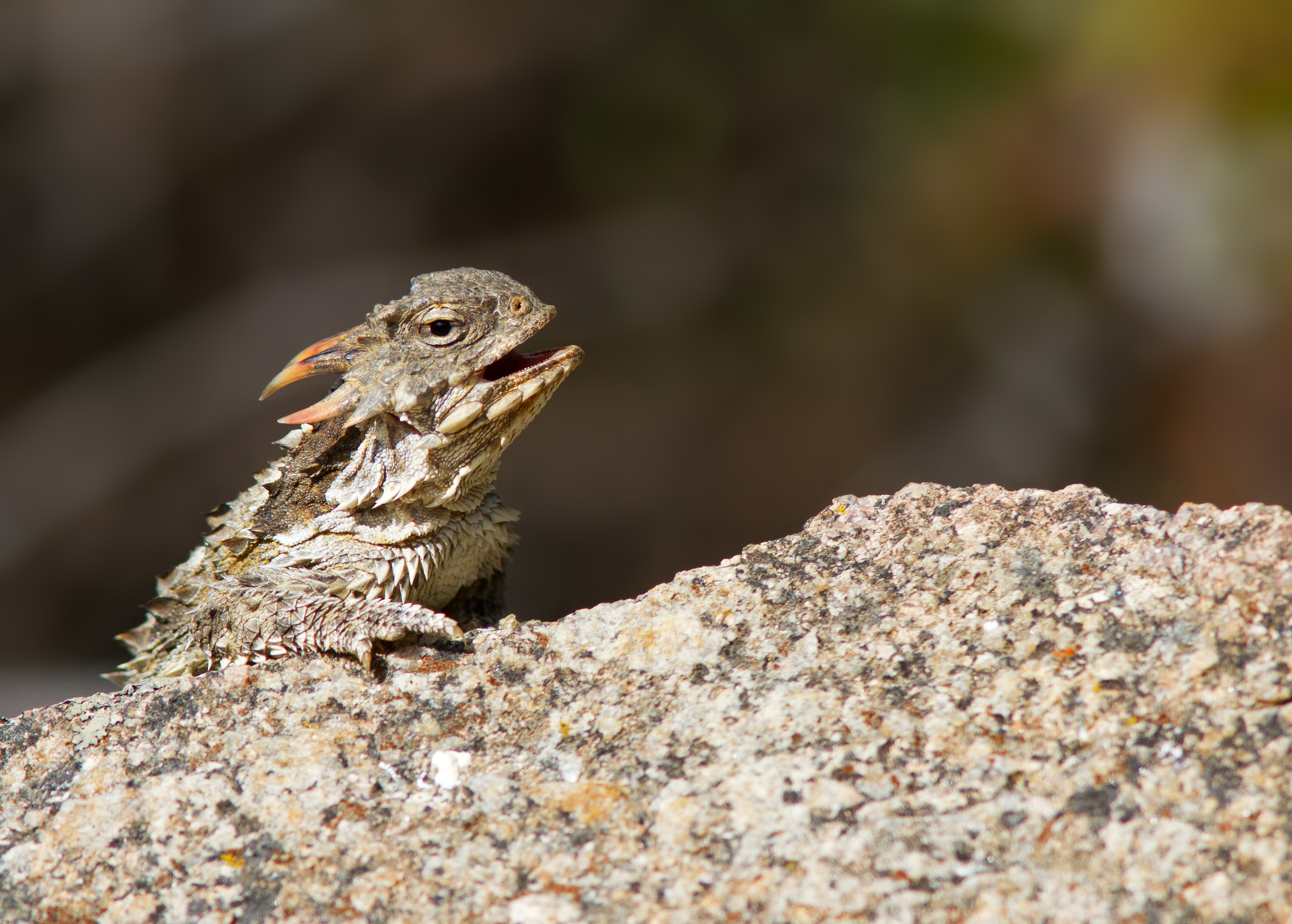

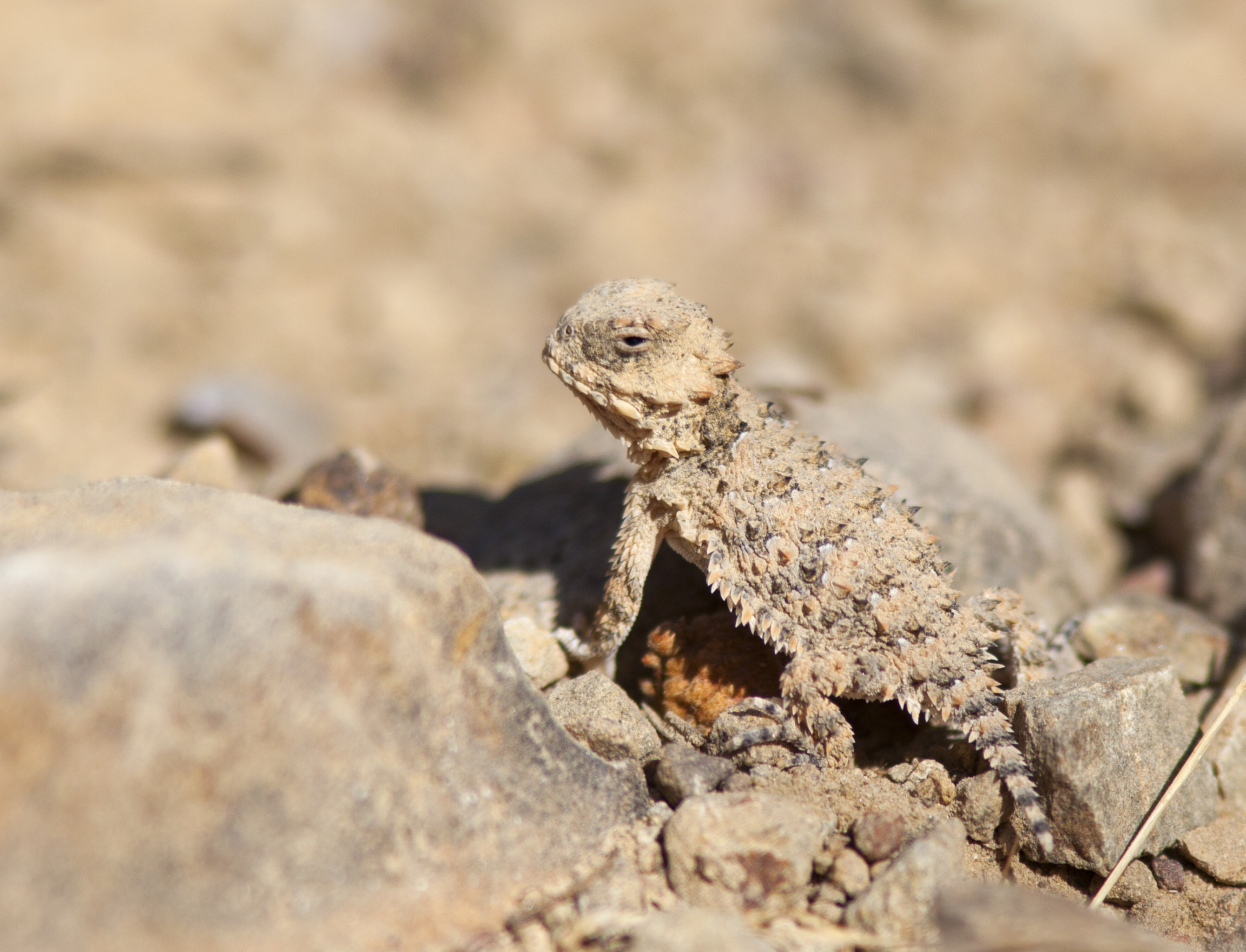
Juvenile
