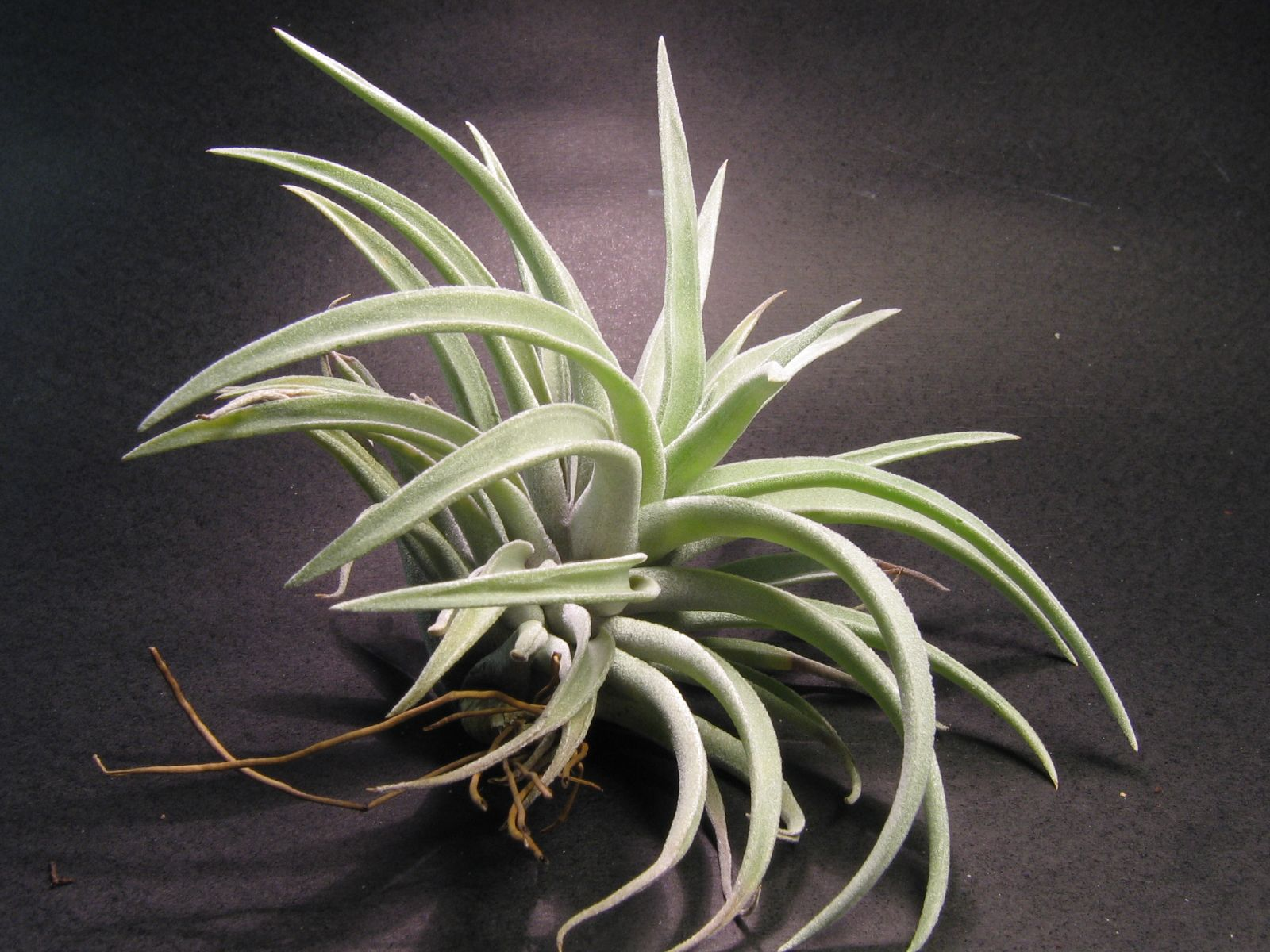
- CITES Appendix II (CITES)

Scientific classification
- Kingdom: Plantae
- Clade: Tracheophytes
- Clade: Angiosperms
- Clade: Monocots
- Clade: Commelinids
- Order: Poales
- Family: Bromeliaceae
- Genus: Tillandsia
- Subgenus: Tillandsia subg. Tillandsia
- Species: T. harrisii

Binomial name
- Tillandsia harrisii Ehlers

= Tillandsia harrisii =

Species of plant

Tillandsia harrisii is a species of flowering plant in the genus Tillandsia. The species is endemic to Guatemala.

== Cultivars ==
- Tillandsia 'Pink Velvet'
- Tillandsia 'Unamit'
