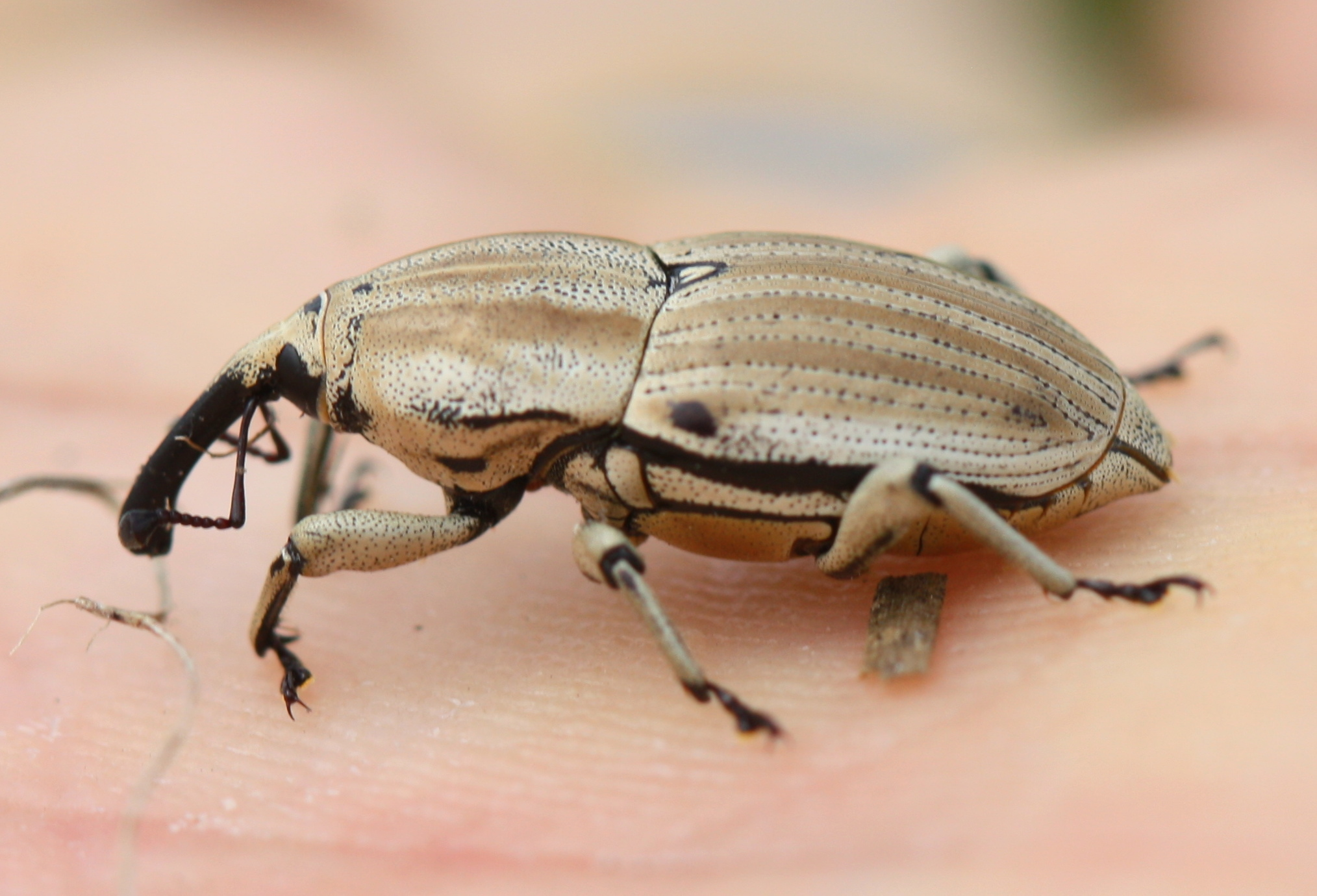

Scientific classification
- Kingdom: Animalia
- Phylum: Arthropoda
- Class: Insecta
- Order: Coleoptera
- Suborder: Polyphaga
- Infraorder: Cucujiformia
- Family: Curculionidae
- Genus: Sphenophorus
- Species: S. aequalis

Binomial name
- Sphenophorus aequalis Gyllenhal, 1838

Synonyms
- Sphenophorus atrivittata Chittenden, 1924; Sphenophorus discolor Mannerheim, 1843; Sphenophorus gemina Blackwelder, 1947; Sphenophorus ochreus LeConte, 1858; Sphenophorus pictus LeConte, 1858; Sphenophorus scirpi Chittenden, 1924; Sphenophorus univitta Chittenden, 1924

= Sphenophorus aequalis =

Species of beetle

Sphenophorus aequalis, the clay-coloured billbug, is a species of beetle in the family Dryophthoridae. It is found in North America.

== Subspecies ==
These five subspecies belong to the species Sphenophorus aequalis:

- Sphenophorus aequalis aequalis Gyllenhal, 1838
- Sphenophorus aequalis ochreus
- Sphenophorus aequalis pictus
- Sphenophorus aequalis scirpi Chittenden
- Sphenophorus aequalis univitta Chittenden
