= Sphenophorus graminis =

Scientific classification
- Kingdom: Animalia
- Phylum: Arthropoda
- Class: Insecta
- Order: Coleoptera
- Suborder: Polyphaga
- Infraorder: Cucujiformia
- Family: Curculionidae
- Genus: Sphenophorus
- Species: S. graminis

Binomial name
- Sphenophorus graminis Chittenden, 1905

Synonyms
- Sphenophorus monterensis Chittenden, 1905; Sphenophorus subopacus Chittenden, 1905

Species of beetle

Sphenophorus graminis is a species of beetle in the family Dryophthoridae. It is found in North America.
