= Sphenophorus costicollis =

Scientific classification
- Kingdom: Animalia
- Phylum: Arthropoda
- Class: Insecta
- Order: Coleoptera
- Suborder: Polyphaga
- Infraorder: Cucujiformia
- Family: Curculionidae
- Genus: Sphenophorus
- Species: S. costicollis

Binomial name
- Sphenophorus costicollis Chittenden, 1919

Synonyms
- Sphenophorus callosipennis Chittenden, 1919

Species of beetle

Sphenophorus costicollis is a species of beetle in the family Dryophthoridae. It is found in North America.

== Subspecies ==
These two subspecies belong to the species Sphenophorus costicollis:

- Sphenophorus costicollis callosipennis Chittenden
- Sphenophorus costicollis costicollis
