= Sphenophorus coesifrons =

Scientific classification
- Kingdom: Animalia
- Phylum: Arthropoda
- Clade: Pancrustacea
- Class: Insecta
- Order: Coleoptera
- Suborder: Polyphaga
- Infraorder: Cucujiformia
- Superfamily: Curculionoidea
- Family: Curculionidae
- Genus: Sphenophorus
- Species: S. coesifrons

Binomial name
- Sphenophorus coesifrons Gyllenhal, 1838

Synonyms
- Sphenophorus lutulentus Champion, 1910; Sphenophorus oblitus LeConte, 1876

Species of beetle

Sphenophorus coesifrons, or the oblite billbug, (Note: From the former scientific name, Calendra oblita, "oblite" from Latin: oblitus, lit. 'indistinct, blurry'.) is a species of beetle in the family Dryophthoridae. It is found in North America. Its length ranges from about a quarter to five-sixteenths of an inch, and it closely resembles the bluegrass billbug, from which it can be distinguished by its shorter and much heavier beak.

The oblite billbug can be found from Maryland and Wisconsin in the north to the Gulf Coast and Arizona in the south. As of 1924, its natural food was unknown, but it had been reared in timothy in the midwestern states of Illinois and Michigan. It was considered extremely destructive to corn along the Gulf Coast, and was recorded destroying the first and second plantings.

Female oblite billbugs were observed laying eggs in late summer, and in captivity the young were slow in developing, spending at least five months in the larval stage. Its life cycle was expected to resemble that of the bluegrass billbug in the northern part of its range, while in the south eggs would be laid in late summer or fall, allowing the young to overwinter as larvae, pupae, or adults.
