= Sphenophorus marinus =

Scientific classification
- Kingdom: Animalia
- Phylum: Arthropoda
- Class: Insecta
- Order: Coleoptera
- Suborder: Polyphaga
- Infraorder: Cucujiformia
- Family: Curculionidae
- Genus: Sphenophorus
- Species: S. marinus

Binomial name
- Sphenophorus marinus Chittenden, 1905

Species of beetle

Sphenophorus marinus is a species of beetle in the family Dryophthoridae. It is found in North America.
