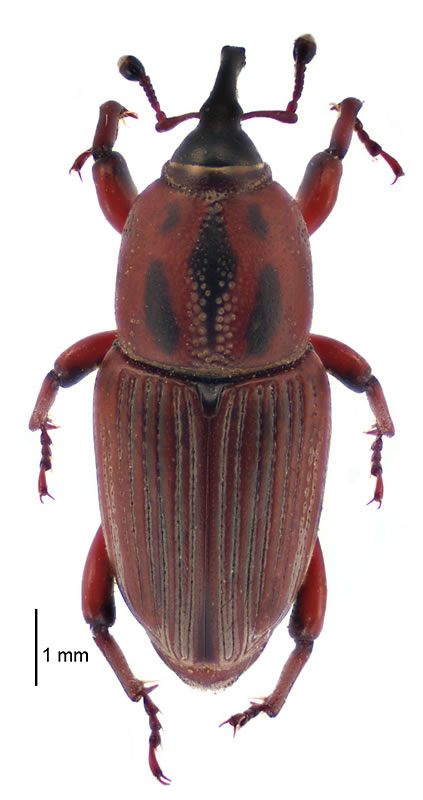

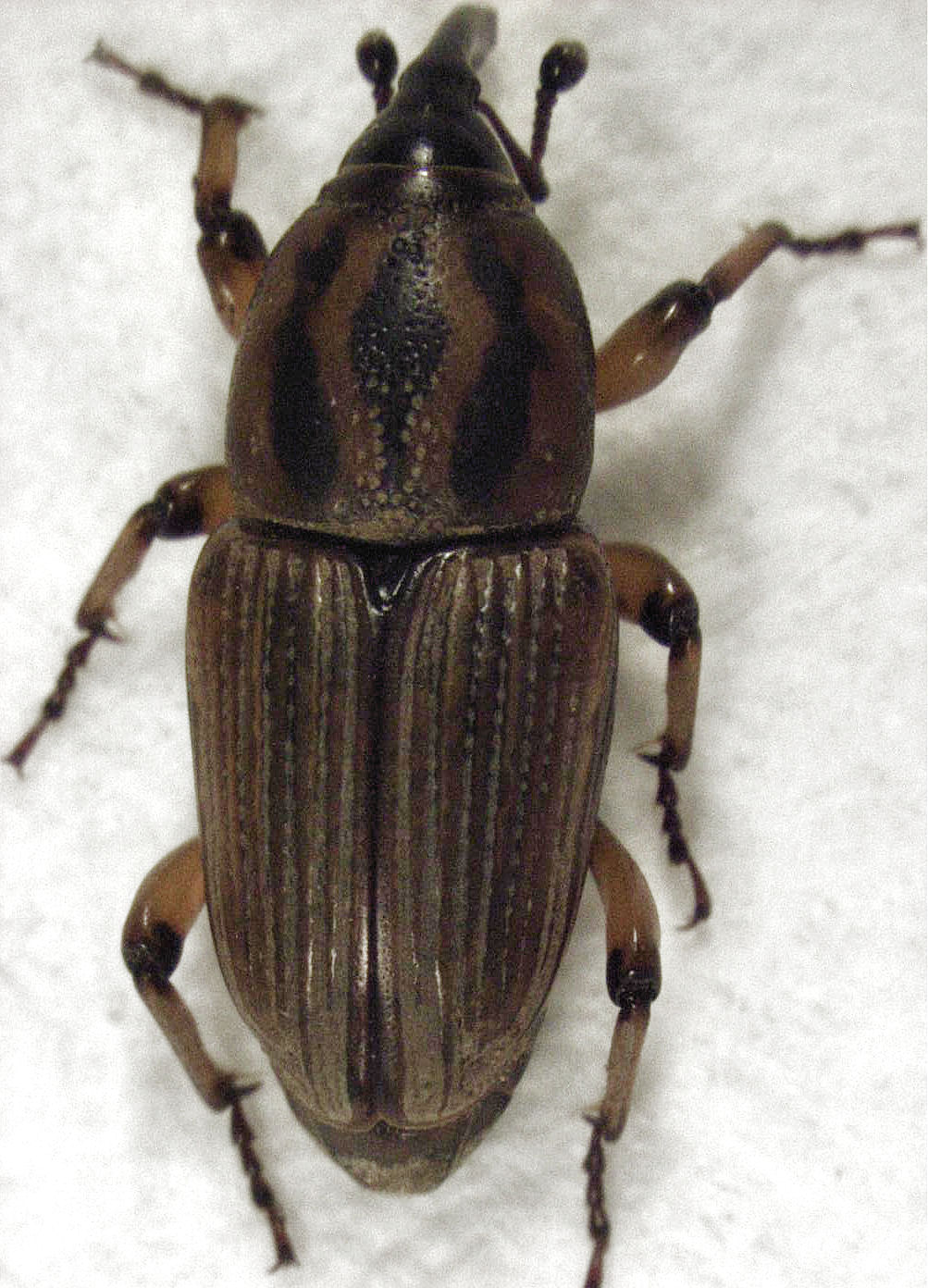
- (female)

Scientific classification
- Kingdom: Animalia
- Phylum: Arthropoda
- Clade: Pancrustacea
- Class: Insecta
- Order: Coleoptera
- Suborder: Polyphaga
- Infraorder: Cucujiformia
- Superfamily: Curculionoidea
- Family: Curculionidae
- Genus: Sphenophorus
- Species: S. brunnipennis

Binomial name
- Sphenophorus brunnipennis (Germar, 1824)

= Sphenophorus brunnipennis =

Species of beetle

Sphenophorus brunnipennis (common name - La Plata weevil) is a beetle in the Dryophthoridae family.

It was first described by Ernst Friedrich Germar in 1824 as Calandra brunnipennis. He describes it as living in Buenos Aires.

Sphenophorus brunipennis arrived in Australia from South America, and was found to have been established in Perth and Brisbane by the 1920s, and it appears to be spreading. It has also been introduced into New Zealand.

== Description ==
This species is part of species group brunipennis, which differ from most other Sphenophorus species groups in their body surfaces being almost entirely glabrous (smooth and without hairs).

Sphenophorus brunipennis ranges from 7 to 9 mm in length. Like most weevils, they have a rostrum (snout), which is shorter than the pronotum, curved and laterally compressed. The pronotum can be either entirely black or red with three black stripes (sometimes merging in front to form an M shape). The elytral intervals similarly can be either red or black. The pygidium has hairs in punctures that are generally obscured by encrustation.

The sexes can be distinguished by the shape of the pygidium apex: truncate in males and more rounded in females. Also, the ventral surface of males is depressed or concave.

Larvae of S. brunipennis reach a maximum length of 9 mm and are creamy-white in colour. The abdomen is grossly expanded at the fourth through to sixth segments.

== Ecology ==
Adults of S. brunipennis feed on grass stems. This involves inserting the rostrum into the stem and walking backwards, leaving behind a longitudinal slit. The larvae feed on roots of sedges and grasses.

They have been found in stomachs of toads (Bufo spp.), suggesting that toads prey on them.
