= Sphenophorus minimus =

Scientific classification
- Kingdom: Animalia
- Phylum: Arthropoda
- Clade: Pancrustacea
- Class: Insecta
- Order: Coleoptera
- Suborder: Polyphaga
- Infraorder: Cucujiformia
- Superfamily: Curculionoidea
- Family: Curculionidae
- Genus: Sphenophorus
- Species: S. minimus

Binomial name
- Sphenophorus minimus Hart, 1890

Species of beetle

Sphenophorus minimus, the lesser billbug, is a species of beetle in the family Dryophthoridae. It is found in North America.
