= Sphenophorus robustus =

Scientific classification
- Kingdom: Animalia
- Phylum: Arthropoda
- Class: Insecta
- Order: Coleoptera
- Suborder: Polyphaga
- Infraorder: Cucujiformia
- Family: Curculionidae
- Genus: Sphenophorus
- Species: S. robustus

Binomial name
- Sphenophorus robustus Horn, 1873

Synonyms
- Calendra multilineatus Satterthwait, 1925; Sphenophorus rectistriatus Chittenden, 1924

Species of beetle

Sphenophorus robustus is a species of beetle in the family Dryophthoridae. It is found in North America.

== Subspecies ==
These two subspecies belong to the species Sphenophorus robustus:

- Sphenophorus robustus rectistriatus Chittenden
- Sphenophorus robustus robustus
