= Sphenophorus holosericus =

Scientific classification
- Kingdom: Animalia
- Phylum: Arthropoda
- Class: Insecta
- Order: Coleoptera
- Suborder: Polyphaga
- Infraorder: Cucujiformia
- Family: Curculionidae
- Genus: Sphenophorus
- Species: S. holosericus

Binomial name
- Sphenophorus holosericus Chittenden, 1924

Synonyms
- Calendra lucedalensis Satterthwait, 1933

Species of beetle

Sphenophorus holosericus is a species of beetle in the family Dryophthoridae. It is found in North America.
