= Orthognathini =

Scientific classification
- Domain: Eukaryota
- Kingdom: Animalia
- Phylum: Arthropoda
- Class: Insecta
- Order: Coleoptera
- Suborder: Polyphaga
- Infraorder: Cucujiformia
- Family: Curculionidae
- Subfamily: Dryophthorinae
- Tribe: Orthognathini

Tribe of beetles

Orthognathini is a tribe of true weevils in the family of beetles known as Curculionidae.

== Genera ==
These genera belong to the tribe Orthognathini:

- Mesocordylus
- Orthognathus Schönherr, 1838^{i c g b}
- Sipalinus

Data sources: i = ITIS, c = Catalogue of Life, g = GBIF, b = Bugguide.net
