= Diocalandra frumenti =

Scientific classification
- Domain: Eukaryota
- Kingdom: Animalia
- Phylum: Arthropoda
- Class: Insecta
- Order: Coleoptera
- Suborder: Polyphaga
- Infraorder: Cucujiformia
- Family: Curculionidae
- Subfamily: Dryophthorinae
- Genus: Diocalandra
- Species: D. frumenti

Binomial name
- Diocalandra frumenti (Fabricius, 1801)

Synonyms
- Sitophilus frumenti Fabricius, 1801; Calandra stigmaticollis Gyllenhal, 1838; Calandra montrouzieri Chevrolat, 1882; Calandra bifasciata Boisduval, 1835; Calandra punctigera Pascoe, 1885; Calandra sechellarum Kolbe, 1910; Diocalandra frumenti Marshall & G.A.K., 1931; Sitophilus stigmaticollis Gyllenhal, 1838; Sitophilus subfasciatus Boheman, 1838; Sitophilus subsignatus Gyllenhal, 1838; Sphenophorus cruciger Motschulsky, 1858; Sphenophorus palmarum Montrouzier, 1861; Calandra frumenti Fabricius, 1801

Species of weevil, pest of the coconut palm

Diocalandra frumenti, commonly known as the palm weevil borer, the lesser coconut weevil, or four-spotted coconut weevil, is a species of weevil in the family Curculionidae. It occurs in Africa, Southern Asia and Northern Australia, and is a pest of coconut and other palm trees.

== Distribution ==
Diocalandra frumenti is found in Somalia, Tanzania, Madagascar, the Seychelles, Mauritius, India, Sri Lanka, Bangladesh, Myanmar, Malaysia, Singapore, Indonesia, the Philippines, Japan, Taiwan, Papua New Guinea, various Pacific island groups and Australia. It has also been recorded in the Canary Islands. Although infesting a number of species of palm, it is a major pest of coconut (Cocos nucifera), oil palm (Elaeis guineensis), Canary Island date palm (Phoenix canariensis), date palm (Phoenix dactylifera), California fan palm (Washingtonia filifera) and Mexican fan palm (Washingtonia robusta).

== Life cycle ==
The adult Diocalandra frumenti is about 7 mm (0.3 in) long. It is a glossy black colour with four large rusty-brown or blackish-brown coloured spots on the elytra (wing covers). The female lays eggs in crevices in the stems of palms which hatch in about a week. The larvae bore into the stem where they form extensive galleries. After eight to ten weeks they pupate, the adult emerging from the pupal case about eleven days later.

== Damage ==
Eggs may be laid among the flowers, in cracks in the leaf or flower stalks, or near the base of the stem just above the adventitious roots. As the larvae bore deeper into the palm, a gummy exudate forms in the entry hole. The galleries can damage any part of the palm including the roots. Leaves may turn yellow and fruit may drop off, and severe infestations may cause the plant to die. It has been found that the males emit a pheromone which attract females, and this may make it possible to trap the insects, which are strong fliers, and reduce the level of infestation. The weevil has a number of natural enemies including a parasite Spathius apicalis, a predatory fly Chrysophilus ferruginosus and a predatory beetle Plaesius javanus.
