= Sphenophorus immunis =

Scientific classification
- Kingdom: Animalia
- Phylum: Arthropoda
- Class: Insecta
- Order: Coleoptera
- Suborder: Polyphaga
- Infraorder: Cucujiformia
- Family: Curculionidae
- Genus: Sphenophorus
- Species: S. immunis

Binomial name
- Sphenophorus immunis (Say, 1832)

Synonyms
- Sphenophorus sayi Gyllenhal, 1838; Sphenophorus subcarinatus Mannerheim, 1843

Species of beetle

Sphenophorus immunis is a species of beetle in the family Curculionidae. Because the type specimen could not be located, the name once was considered a junior synonym of Sphenophorus venatus of authors [being itself a misinterpreted name].
