= Xerodermus =

Scientific classification
- Domain: Eukaryota
- Kingdom: Animalia
- Phylum: Arthropoda
- Class: Insecta
- Order: Coleoptera
- Suborder: Polyphaga
- Infraorder: Cucujiformia
- Family: Curculionidae
- Subfamily: Dryophthorinae
- Genus: Xerodermus; T. Lacordaire, 1865

Genus of beetles

Xerodermus is a genus of weevils in the beetle subfamily Dryophthorinae. There are at least four described species in Xerodermus.

== Species ==
These four species belong to the genus Xerodermus:

- Xerodermus cylindricollis Marshall, 1931
- Xerodermus direptus Marshall, 1931
- Xerodermus himalayanus Marshall, 1931
- Xerodermus porcellus Lacordaire, T., 1865 (India, Sri Lanka)
