= Orthognathus subparallelus =

Scientific classification
- Domain: Eukaryota
- Kingdom: Animalia
- Phylum: Arthropoda
- Class: Insecta
- Order: Coleoptera
- Suborder: Polyphaga
- Infraorder: Cucujiformia
- Family: Curculionidae
- Genus: Orthognathus
- Species: O. subparallelus

Binomial name
- Orthognathus subparallelus (Chevrolat, 1880)

Species of beetle

Orthognathus subparallelus is a species of beetle in the family Dryophthoridae. It is found in Central America and North America.
