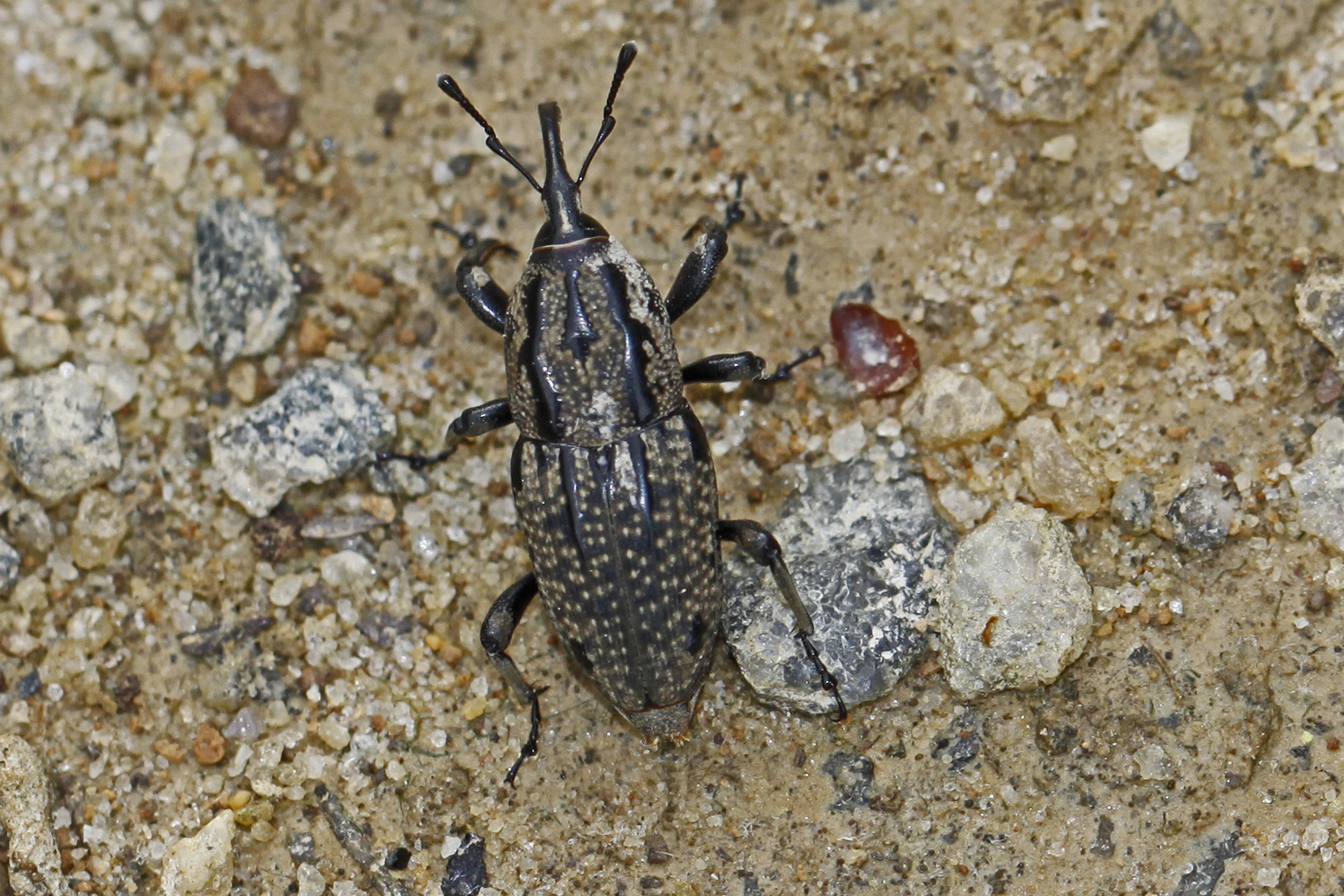

Scientific classification
- Kingdom: Animalia
- Phylum: Arthropoda
- Class: Insecta
- Order: Coleoptera
- Suborder: Polyphaga
- Infraorder: Cucujiformia
- Family: Curculionidae
- Genus: Sphenophorus
- Species: S. cariosus

Binomial name
- Sphenophorus cariosus (Olivier, 1807)

Synonyms
- Calandra larvalis Germar, 1824; Rhynchophorus cicatricosus Say, 1831; Sphenophorus flexuosus Gyllenhal, 1838; Sphenophorus sculptilis Uhler, 1856

= Sphenophorus cariosus =

Species of beetle

Sphenophorus cariosus, the nutgrass billbug, is a species of beetle in the family Dryophthoridae. It is found in North America.
