= Sphenophorus pertinax =

Scientific classification
- Kingdom: Animalia
- Phylum: Arthropoda
- Clade: Pancrustacea
- Class: Insecta
- Order: Coleoptera
- Suborder: Polyphaga
- Infraorder: Cucujiformia
- Superfamily: Curculionoidea
- Family: Curculionidae
- Genus: Sphenophorus
- Species: S. pertinax

Binomial name
- Sphenophorus pertinax (Olivier, 1807)

Synonyms
- Rhynchophorus truncatus Say, 1831; Sphenophorus canaliculatus Boheman, 1845; Sphenophorus intervallatus Chittenden, 1924; Sphenophorus ludoviciana Chittenden, 1905; Sphenophorus nasutus Chittenden, 1924; Sphenophorus peninsularis Chittenden, 1905; Sphenophorus semicalvus Hustache, 1936; Sphenophorus setiger Chittenden, 1905

Species of beetle

Sphenophorus pertinax is a species of beetle in the family Dryophthoridae. It is found in North America.
