= Sphenophorus maidis =

Scientific classification
- Kingdom: Animalia
- Phylum: Arthropoda
- Clade: Pancrustacea
- Class: Insecta
- Order: Coleoptera
- Suborder: Polyphaga
- Infraorder: Cucujiformia
- Superfamily: Curculionoidea
- Family: Curculionidae
- Genus: Sphenophorus
- Species: S. maidis

Binomial name
- Sphenophorus maidis Chittenden, 1905

Species of beetle

Sphenophorus maidis, the maize billbug, is a species of beetles in the family Curculionidae. It is found in North America.
