= Rhinostomus frontalis =

Scientific classification
- Kingdom: Animalia
- Phylum: Arthropoda
- Class: Insecta
- Order: Coleoptera
- Suborder: Polyphaga
- Infraorder: Cucujiformia
- Family: Curculionidae
- Subfamily: Dryophthorinae
- Genus: Rhinostomus
- Species: R. frontalis

Binomial name
- Rhinostomus frontalis (LeConte, 1874)

Synonyms
- Yuccaborus frontalis LeConte, 1876

Species of beetle

Rhinostomus frontalis is a species of weevils, previously placed in a genus called Yuccaborus and known as the yucca weevils.
