= Sphenophorus subulatus =

Scientific classification
- Kingdom: Animalia
- Phylum: Arthropoda
- Class: Insecta
- Order: Coleoptera
- Suborder: Polyphaga
- Infraorder: Cucujiformia
- Family: Curculionidae
- Subfamily: Dryophthorinae
- Tribe: Sphenophorini
- Genus: Sphenophorus
- Species: S. subulatus

Binomial name
- Sphenophorus subulatus Chittenden, 1905

Species of beetle

Sphenophorus subulatus is a species in the weevil family Curculionidae. It is found in North America.
