= Sphenophorus australis =

Scientific classification
- Kingdom: Animalia
- Phylum: Arthropoda
- Clade: Pancrustacea
- Class: Insecta
- Order: Coleoptera
- Suborder: Polyphaga
- Infraorder: Cucujiformia
- Superfamily: Curculionoidea
- Family: Curculionidae
- Genus: Sphenophorus
- Species: S. australis

Binomial name
- Sphenophorus australis Chittenden, 1905

Synonyms
- Sphenophorus abrasa Chittenden, 1905; Sphenophorus typhae Chittenden, 1905

Species of beetle

Sphenophorus australis is a species of beetle in the family Dryophthoridae. It is found in North America.

== Subspecies ==
These two subspecies belong to the species Sphenophorus australis:

- Sphenophorus australis abrasus
- Sphenophorus australis australis
