= Sphenophorus tardus =

Scientific classification
- Kingdom: Animalia
- Phylum: Arthropoda
- Class: Insecta
- Order: Coleoptera
- Suborder: Polyphaga
- Infraorder: Cucujiformia
- Family: Curculionidae
- Genus: Sphenophorus
- Species: S. tardus

Binomial name
- Sphenophorus tardus Fall, 1901

Species of beetle

Sphenophorus tardus is a species of beetle in the family Dryophthoridae. It is found in North America.
