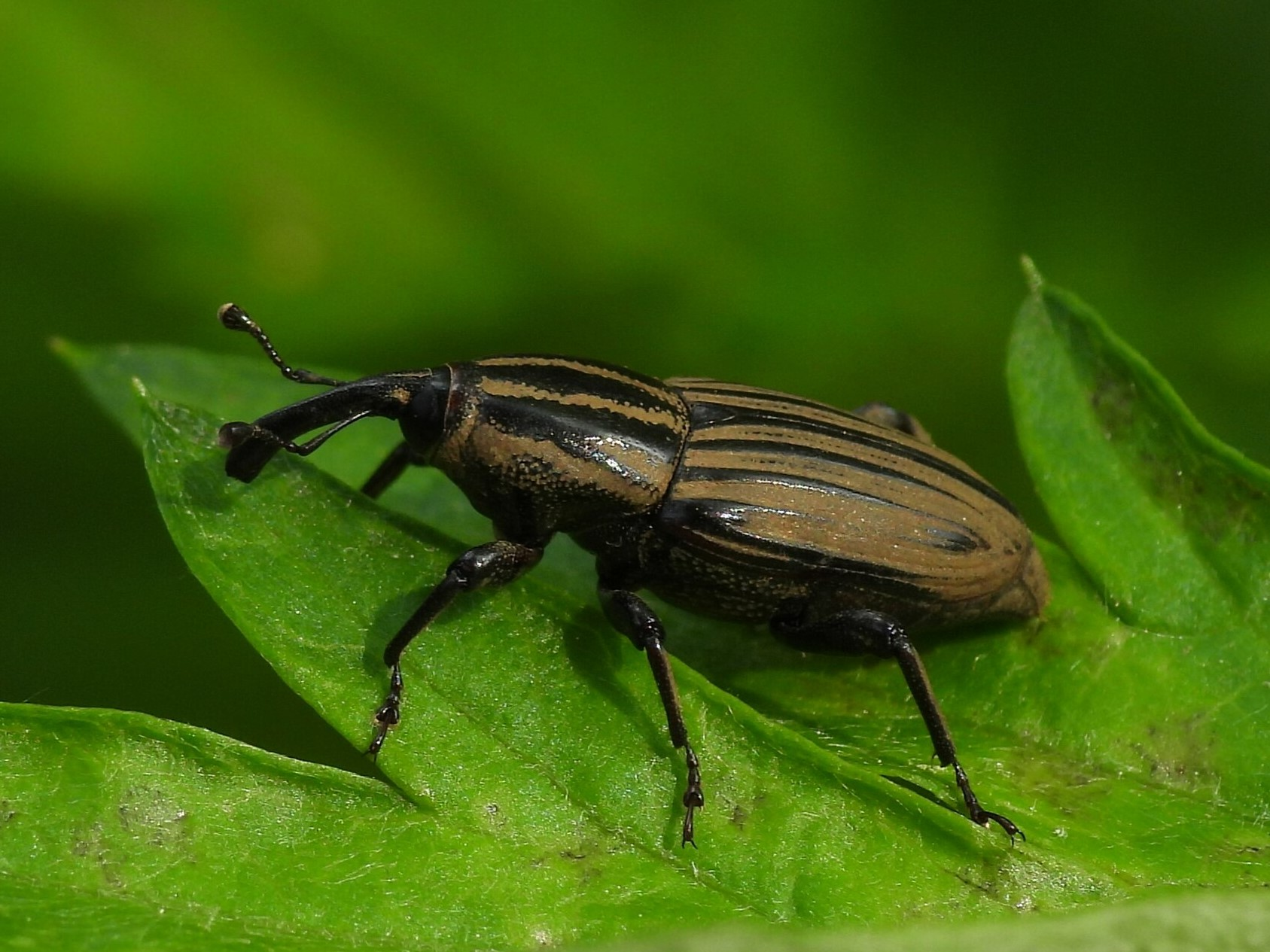

Scientific classification
- Kingdom: Animalia
- Phylum: Arthropoda
- Class: Insecta
- Order: Coleoptera
- Suborder: Polyphaga
- Infraorder: Cucujiformia
- Family: Curculionidae
- Genus: Sphenophorus
- Species: S. costipennis

Binomial name
- Sphenophorus costipennis Horn, 1873

Synonyms
- Calendra medoraensis Satterthwait, 1925; Sphenophorus laevigatus Chittenden, 1905

= Sphenophorus costipennis =

Species of beetle

Sphenophorus costipennis is a species of beetle in the family Dryophthoridae. It is found in North America.
