= Xerodermus porcellus =

Scientific classification
- Kingdom: Animalia
- Phylum: Arthropoda
- Class: Insecta
- Order: Coleoptera
- Suborder: Polyphaga
- Infraorder: Cucujiformia
- Family: Curculionidae
- Subfamily: Dryophthorinae
- Genus: Xerodermus
- Species: X. porcellus

Binomial name
- Xerodermus porcellus Lacordaire, 1866

Synonyms
- Orthosinus sculpticollis Motschulsky, 1863

Species of beetle

Xerodermus porcellus, is a species of weevil found in India and Sri Lanka.
