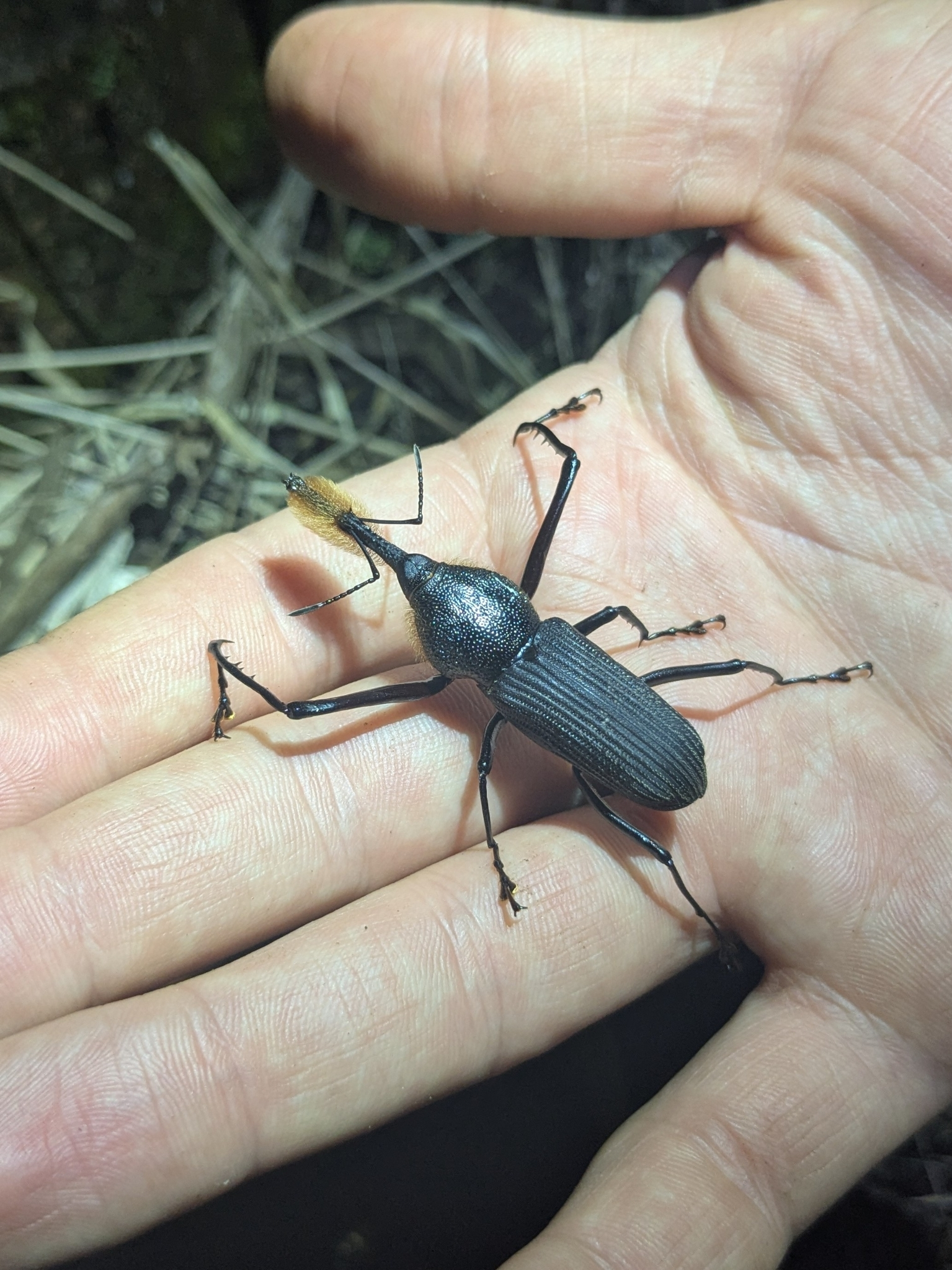
- Rhinostomus barbirostris, Colombia

Scientific classification
- Kingdom: Animalia
- Phylum: Arthropoda
- Class: Insecta
- Order: Coleoptera
- Suborder: Polyphaga
- Infraorder: Cucujiformia
- Family: Curculionidae
- Subfamily: Dryophthorinae
- Genus: Rhinostomus
- Species: R. barbirostris

Binomial name
- Rhinostomus barbirostris (Fabricius, 1775)

Synonyms
- Curculio barbirostris Fabricius, 1775; Rhina barbirostris (Fabricius, 1775); Rhina barbicornis Latreille, 1802 (lapsus for barbirostris Fabricius); Rhina verrirostris Illiger, 1806; Rhina affaber Fahraeus, 1838; Rhina costalis Fahraeus, 1838; Rhina ebriosa Fahraeus, 1838

= Rhinostomus barbirostris =

Species of beetle

Rhinostomus barbirostris, common name bottlebrush weevil or bearded weevil, is a species of true weevil.

== Description ==
Rhinostomus barbirostris can reach a length of 11–40 millimetres (0.43–1.57 in), excluding beak. It is probably the third-largest weevil in the world. The basic color is black. The pronotum is as long as wide and densely punctate. The elytra bear distinct striae and are deeply punctate. Males have characteristic long reddish gold hairs on the apical portion of the long, straight, and dorsally dentate rostrum. The antennae are long and slender, and strongly elbowed. The front tibiae have two or more large, sharp teeth on the inner face. This species shows an unusual sexual polymorphism, as some males in each population are smaller than other males and resemble females.

== Distribution ==
This common and widespread species occurs mainly in Central America and South America, while similar species in the genus occur in the United States, Africa, Madagascar, Borneo, and India.
