= Sphenophorus germari =

Scientific classification
- Kingdom: Animalia
- Phylum: Arthropoda
- Clade: Pancrustacea
- Class: Insecta
- Order: Coleoptera
- Suborder: Polyphaga
- Infraorder: Cucujiformia
- Superfamily: Curculionoidea
- Family: Curculionidae
- Genus: Sphenophorus
- Species: S. germari

Binomial name
- Sphenophorus germari Horn, 1873

Synonyms
- Sphenophorus pinguis Chittenden, 1924

Species of beetle

Sphenophorus germari is a species in the family Curculionidae (snout and bark beetles). It is found in North America.
