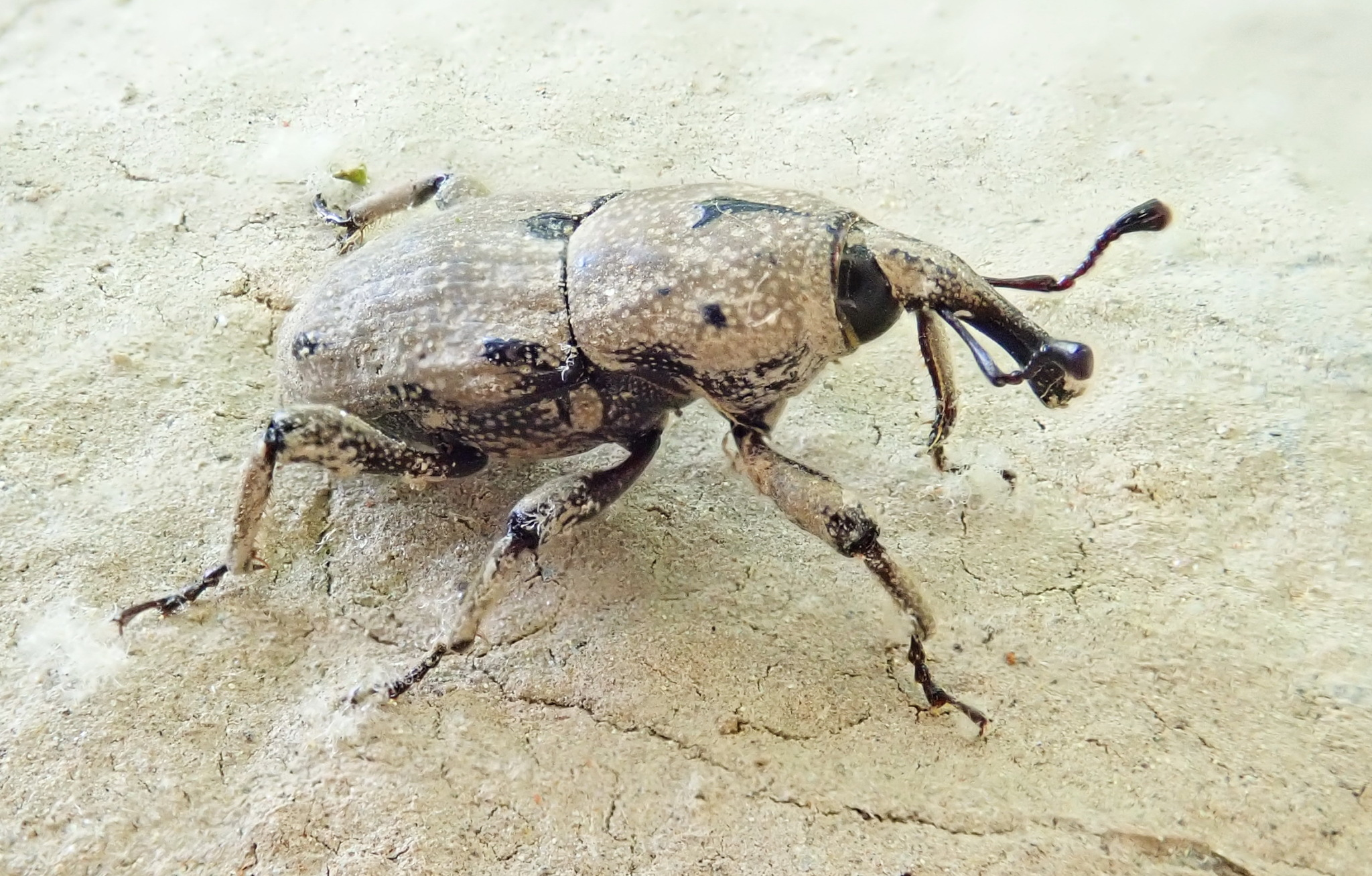

Scientific classification
- Kingdom: Animalia
- Phylum: Arthropoda
- Class: Insecta
- Order: Coleoptera
- Suborder: Polyphaga
- Infraorder: Cucujiformia
- Family: Curculionidae
- Genus: Sphenophorus
- Species: S. melanocephalus

Binomial name
- Sphenophorus melanocephalus (Fabricius, 1801)

Synonyms
- Rhynchophorus inaequalis Say, 1832; Sphenophorus contractus Gyllenhal, 1838

= Sphenophorus melanocephalus =

Species of beetle

Sphenophorus melanocephalus is a species of beetle in the family Curculionidae found in North America. Because type specimens were unavailable, the name once was misused for a different species, Sphenophorus nubilus.
