= Sphenophorus callosus =

Scientific classification
- Kingdom: Animalia
- Phylum: Arthropoda
- Clade: Pancrustacea
- Class: Insecta
- Order: Coleoptera
- Suborder: Polyphaga
- Infraorder: Cucujiformia
- Superfamily: Curculionoidea
- Family: Curculionidae
- Genus: Sphenophorus
- Species: S. callosus

Binomial name
- Sphenophorus callosus (Olivier, 1807)

Synonyms
- Sphenophorus jugosus Chittenden, 1924

Species of beetle

Sphenophorus callosus, the southern corn billbug, is a species of snout or bark beetle in the family Curculionidae. It is found in North America.
