= Sphenophorus cultrirostris =

Scientific classification
- Kingdom: Animalia
- Phylum: Arthropoda
- Class: Insecta
- Order: Coleoptera
- Suborder: Polyphaga
- Infraorder: Cucujiformia
- Family: Curculionidae
- Genus: Sphenophorus
- Species: S. cultrirostris

Binomial name
- Sphenophorus cultrirostris Gyllenhal, 1838

Synonyms
- Calandra compressirostra Say, 1824; Sphenophorus compressirostris (Say, 1824); Sphenophorus obscuripennis Chittenden, 1924

Species of beetle

Sphenophorus cultrirostris is species of beetle in the family Curculionidae found in North America. The name was proposed to replace the supposed junior homonym Sphenophorus compressirostris (Germar, 1823), which not only had date priority over Calandra compressirostra Say but also a differently composed specific epithet. The homonymy was maintained nevertheless because the original spelling did not prevail.
