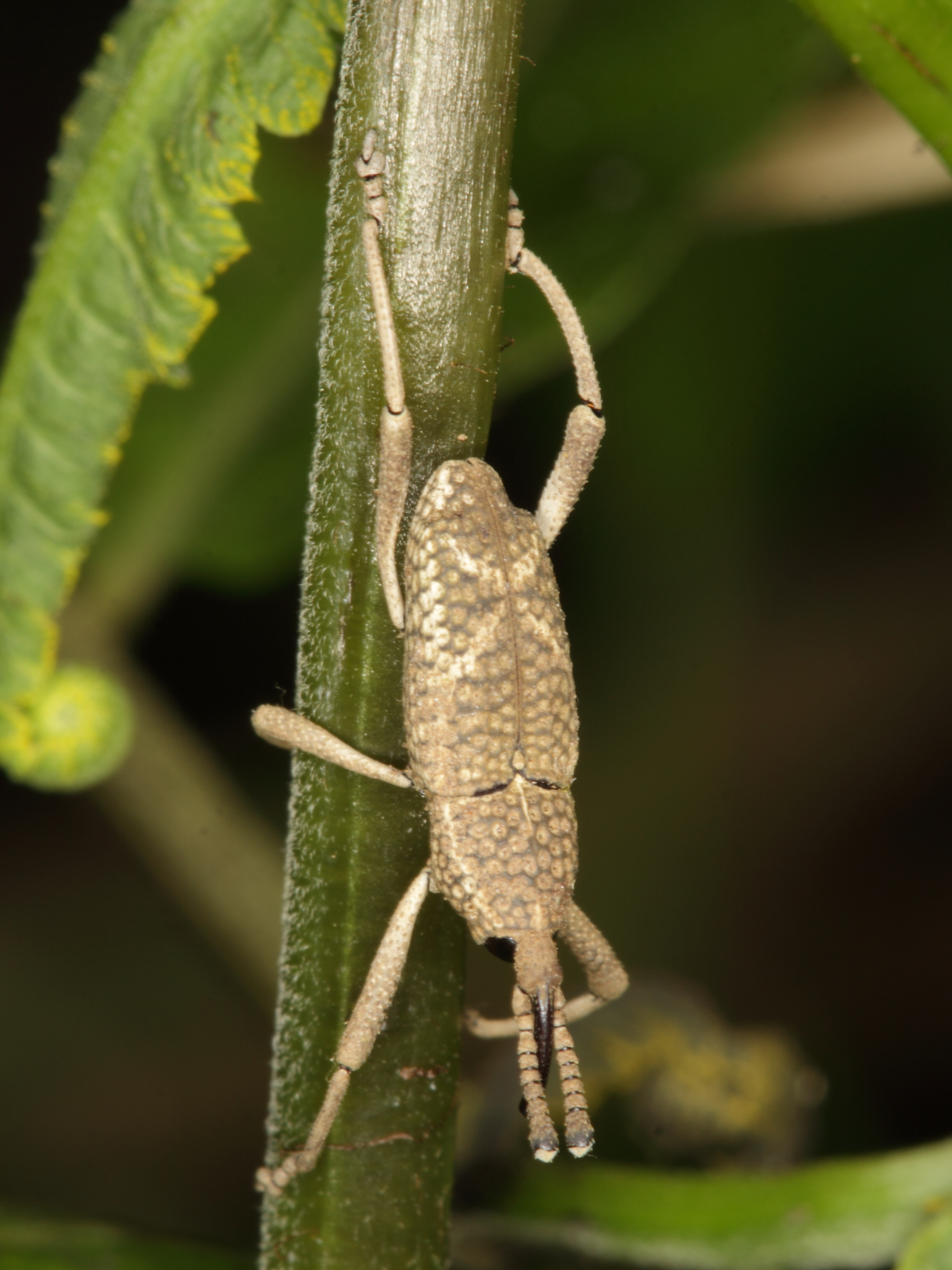
- Probable undet. forest species from Java

Scientific classification
- Kingdom: Animalia
- Phylum: Arthropoda
- Class: Insecta
- Order: Coleoptera
- Suborder: Polyphaga
- Infraorder: Cucujiformia
- Family: Curculionidae
- Subfamily: Dryophthorinae
- Genus: Cryptoderma; Ritsema C, 1885

Synonyms
- Nosoxylon Gistl, 1848; Octotoma Sturm, 1826; Oxyrhyncus Dumeril, 1827; Oxyrrhynchus Gemminger & Harold, 1871

= Cryptoderma =

Genus of beetles

Cryptoderma is a genus of weevils in the subfamily Dryophthorinae and the monotypic tribe Cryptodermatini. Species records currently appear to be limited to eastern Asia.

== Species ==
The Catalogue of Life lists:

- Cryptoderma andreae Pascoe F.P, 1885
- Cryptoderma brevipenne Ritsema C, 1882
- Cryptoderma collare Ritsema C, 1882
- Cryptoderma convexum Ritsema C, 1882
- Cryptoderma discors Bovie, 1908
- Cryptoderma drescheri Günther, 1937
- Cryptoderma fabricii Ritsema C, 1882
- Cryptoderma formosense Kôno H, 1934
- Cryptoderma fortunei Waterhouse, 1853
- Cryptoderma fractisignum Heller KM, 1934
- Cryptoderma grande Fairmaire L, 1891
- Cryptoderma hydropicum Chevrolat LAA, 1853
- Cryptoderma inchoatum Marshall GAK, 1932
- Cryptoderma knapperti Veth, 1905
- Cryptoderma laterale Boheman C.H. in Schönherr C.J, 1833
- Cryptoderma lobatum Ritsema C, 1905
- Cryptoderma longicolle Heller KM, 1924
- Cryptoderma mac-gillavryi Veth, 1916
- Cryptoderma mangyanum Heller KM, 1924
- Cryptoderma maximum Heller KM, 1897
- Cryptoderma perakense Marshall GAK, 1932
- Cryptoderma philippinense Waterhouse, 1853
- Cryptoderma plicatipenne Ritsema C, 1912
- Cryptoderma regulare Ritsema C, 1882
- Cryptoderma rivulosum Boheman C.H. in Schönherr C.J, 1833
- Cryptoderma sancti-andreae Ritsema C, 1882
- Cryptoderma suturale Roelofs W, 1880
