= Sphenophorus nubilus =

Scientific classification
- Kingdom: Animalia
- Phylum: Arthropoda
- Class: Insecta
- Order: Coleoptera
- Suborder: Polyphaga
- Infraorder: Cucujiformia
- Family: Curculionidae
- Genus: Sphenophorus
- Species: S. nubilus

Binomial name
- Sphenophorus nubilus Gyllenhal, 1838

Species of beetle

Sphenophorus nubilus is a species of beetle in the family Curculionidae. Because type specimens were unavailable, the name once was considered a junior synonym of Sphenophorus melanocephalus.
