= Sphenophorus compressirostris =

Scientific classification
- Kingdom: Animalia
- Phylum: Arthropoda
- Class: Insecta
- Order: Coleoptera
- Suborder: Polyphaga
- Infraorder: Cucujiformia
- Family: Curculionidae
- Genus: Sphenophorus
- Species: S. compressirostris

Binomial name
- Sphenophorus compressirostris (Germar, 1823)

Synonyms
- Sphenophorus germari Horn, 1873; Sphenophorus pinguis Chittenden, 1924

Species of beetle

Sphenophorus compressirostris is a species of beetle in the family Curculionidae found in North America. The name should not be confused with Sphenophorus compessirostris (Say, 1824), a name replaced with Sphenophorus cultrirostris Gyllenhal, 1838.
