= Sphenophorus pontederiae =

Scientific classification
- Kingdom: Animalia
- Phylum: Arthropoda
- Class: Insecta
- Order: Coleoptera
- Suborder: Polyphaga
- Infraorder: Cucujiformia
- Family: Curculionidae
- Genus: Sphenophorus
- Species: S. pontederiae

Binomial name
- Sphenophorus pontederiae Chittenden, 1905

Species of beetle

Sphenophorus pontederiae is a species of snout or bark beetle in the family Curculionidae. It is found in North America.
