= Sphenophorus venatus =

Scientific classification
- Kingdom: Animalia
- Phylum: Arthropoda
- Clade: Pancrustacea
- Class: Insecta
- Order: Coleoptera
- Suborder: Polyphaga
- Infraorder: Cucujiformia
- Superfamily: Curculionoidea
- Family: Curculionidae
- Genus: Sphenophorus
- Species: S. venatus

Binomial name
- Sphenophorus venatus (Say, 1831)

Synonyms
- Rhynchophorus immunis Say, 1831; Rhynchophorus placidus Say, 1831; Sphenophorus confluens Chittenden, 1904; Sphenophorus confusus Gyllenhal, 1838; Sphenophorus fallax Boheman, 1845; Sphenophorus glyceriae Chittenden, 1919; Sphenophorus reticulaticollis Boheman, 1845; Sphenophorus vestitus Chittenden, 1904

Species of beetle

Sphenophorus venatus, the hunting billbug, is a species of beetle in the family Dryophthoridae. It is found in Central America and North America, while it has been spread in the Balkans and Eastern Mediterranean.

== Subspecies ==
These four subspecies belong to the species Sphenophorus venatus:

- Sphenophorus venatus confluens
- Sphenophorus venatus glyceriae
- Sphenophorus venatus venatus (Say, 1831)
- Sphenophorus venatus vestitus Chittenden, 1904 (hunting billbug)
