= Orthognathus =

Scientific classification
- Domain: Eukaryota
- Kingdom: Animalia
- Phylum: Arthropoda
- Class: Insecta
- Order: Coleoptera
- Suborder: Polyphaga
- Infraorder: Cucujiformia
- Family: Curculionidae
- Subfamily: Dryophthorinae
- Genus: Orthognathus; Schönherr, 1838

Genus of beetles

Orthognathus is a genus of snout and bark beetles in the family Dryophthoridae. There are about seven described species in Orthognathus.

== Species ==
These seven species belong to the genus Orthognathus:

- Orthognathus albofuscus Blanchard, 1846
- Orthognathus coelomerus Csiki & E., 1936
- Orthognathus dejeanii Buquet, 1837
- Orthognathus guyanensis Rheinheimer, 2015
- Orthognathus imaginis Vaurie, 1970
- Orthognathus lividus Gyllenhal, 1838
- Orthognathus subparallelus (Chevrolat, 1880)
