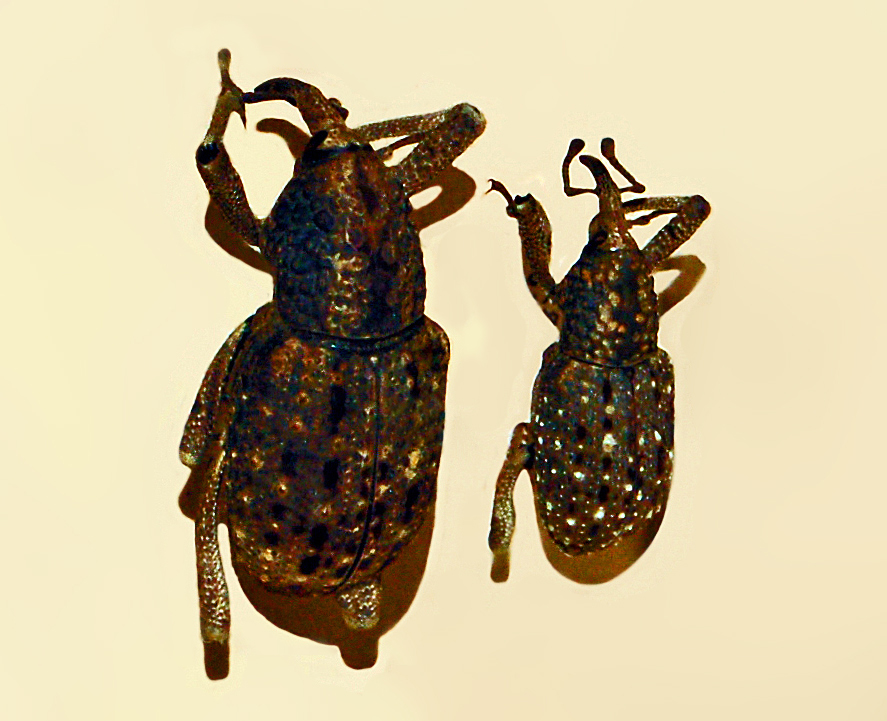
- Sipalinus gigas granulatus from New Guinea

Scientific classification
- Kingdom: Animalia
- Phylum: Arthropoda
- Class: Insecta
- Order: Coleoptera
- Suborder: Polyphaga
- Infraorder: Cucujiformia
- Family: Curculionidae
- Tribe: Orthognathini
- Genus: Sipalinus; Marshall, 1943

Synonyms
- Sipalus Schoenherr, 1825 (Preocc.); Hyposipalus Voss, 1940 (Nom. Nud.); Sipalinus Marshall, 1943

= Sipalinus =

Sipalinus gigas

Genus of beetles

Sipalinus is a genus of beetles belonging to the family Curculionidae.

== Description ==
Sipalinus is composed of seven species, five from Africa and two from Eurasia and Australasia. These species are quite large (up to 28 mm.) and robust, the basic colour is brownish, the surface is crusty looking, often heavily tuberculate and elytra are usually mottled with whitish and dark brown. Some species are wood bores, and may occasionally be found in wood used for crates or structural timbers.

== List of species and subspecies ==
- Sipalinus gigas (Fabricius)
  - Sipalinus gigas gigas (Fabricius)
  - Sipalinus gigas granulatus (Fabricius)
- Sipalinus yunnanensis
- Sipalinus guineensis (Fabricius)
- Sipalinus burmeisteri (Boheman)
- Sipalinus squalidus (Kolbe)
- Sipalinus aloysiisabaudiae (Camerano)
- Sipalinus auritvilli (Duvivier)
- Semiotus zonatus Candèze, 1874
