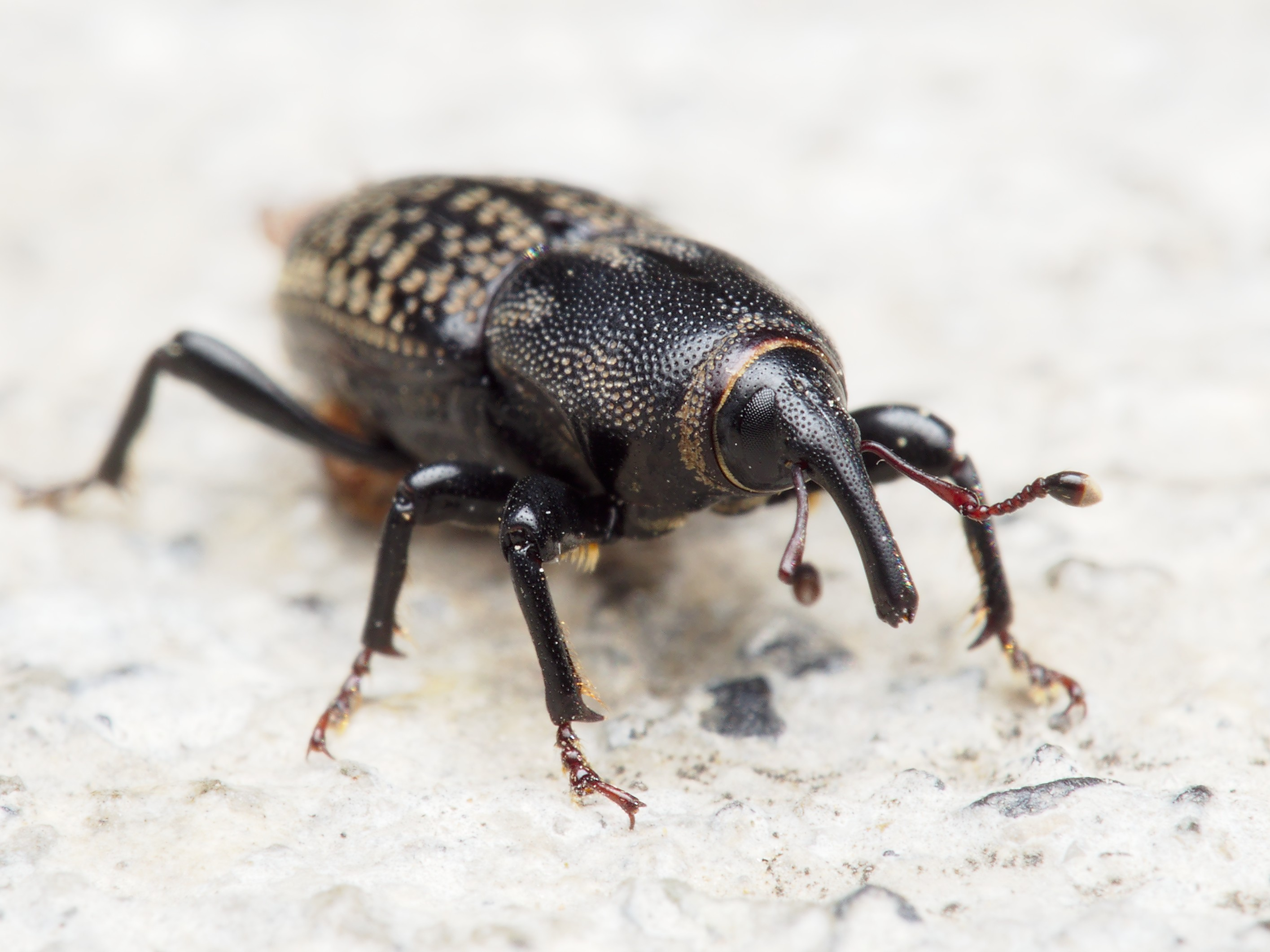

Scientific classification
- Kingdom: Animalia
- Phylum: Arthropoda
- Clade: Pancrustacea
- Class: Insecta
- Order: Coleoptera
- Suborder: Polyphaga
- Infraorder: Cucujiformia
- Family: Curculionidae
- Genus: Sphenophorus
- Species: S. cicatristriatus

Binomial name
- Sphenophorus cicatristriatus Fåhraeus, 1838

Synonyms
- Sphenophorus cicatripennis Fahraeus, 1845; Sphenophorus ulkei Horn, 1873; Sphenophorus variolosus LeConte, 1876

= Sphenophorus cicatristriatus =

Species of beetle

Sphenophorus cicatristriatus, known generally as the Rocky Mountain billbug or Denver billbug, is a species of true weevil in the beetle family Curculionidae. It is found in North America.

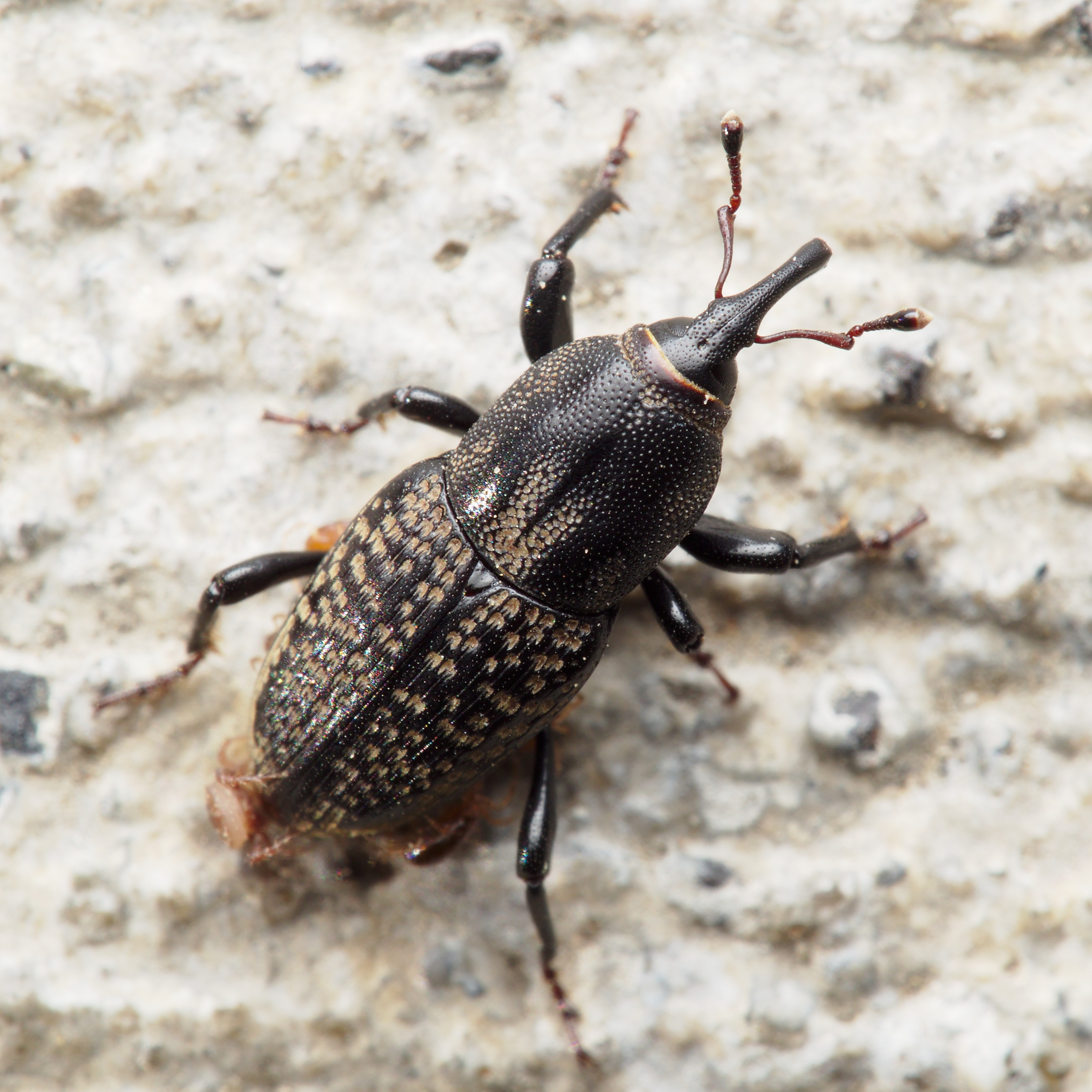
Rocky Mountain billbug, Sphenophorus cicatristriatus

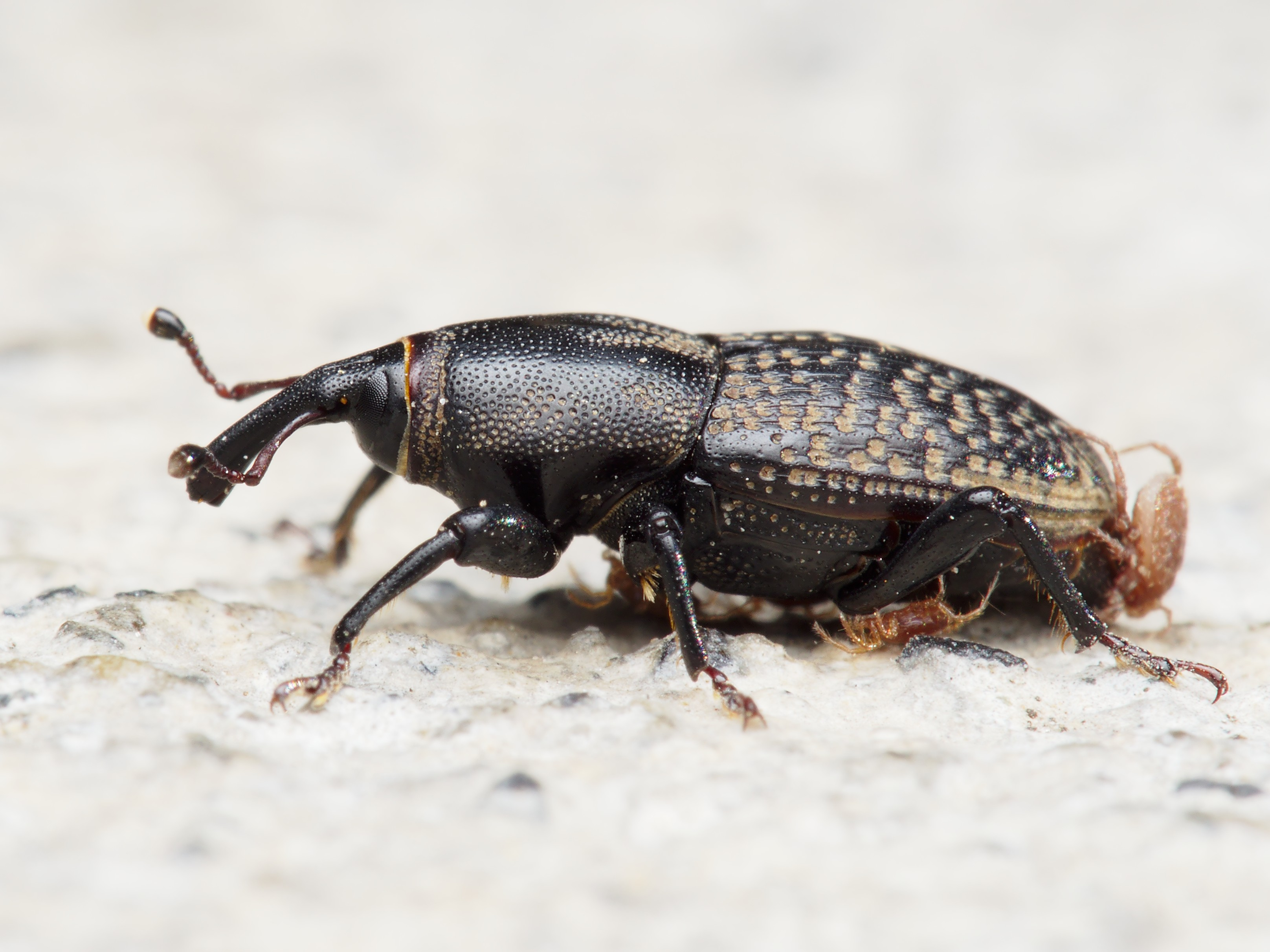
Rocky Mountain billbug, Sphenophorus cicatristriatus
