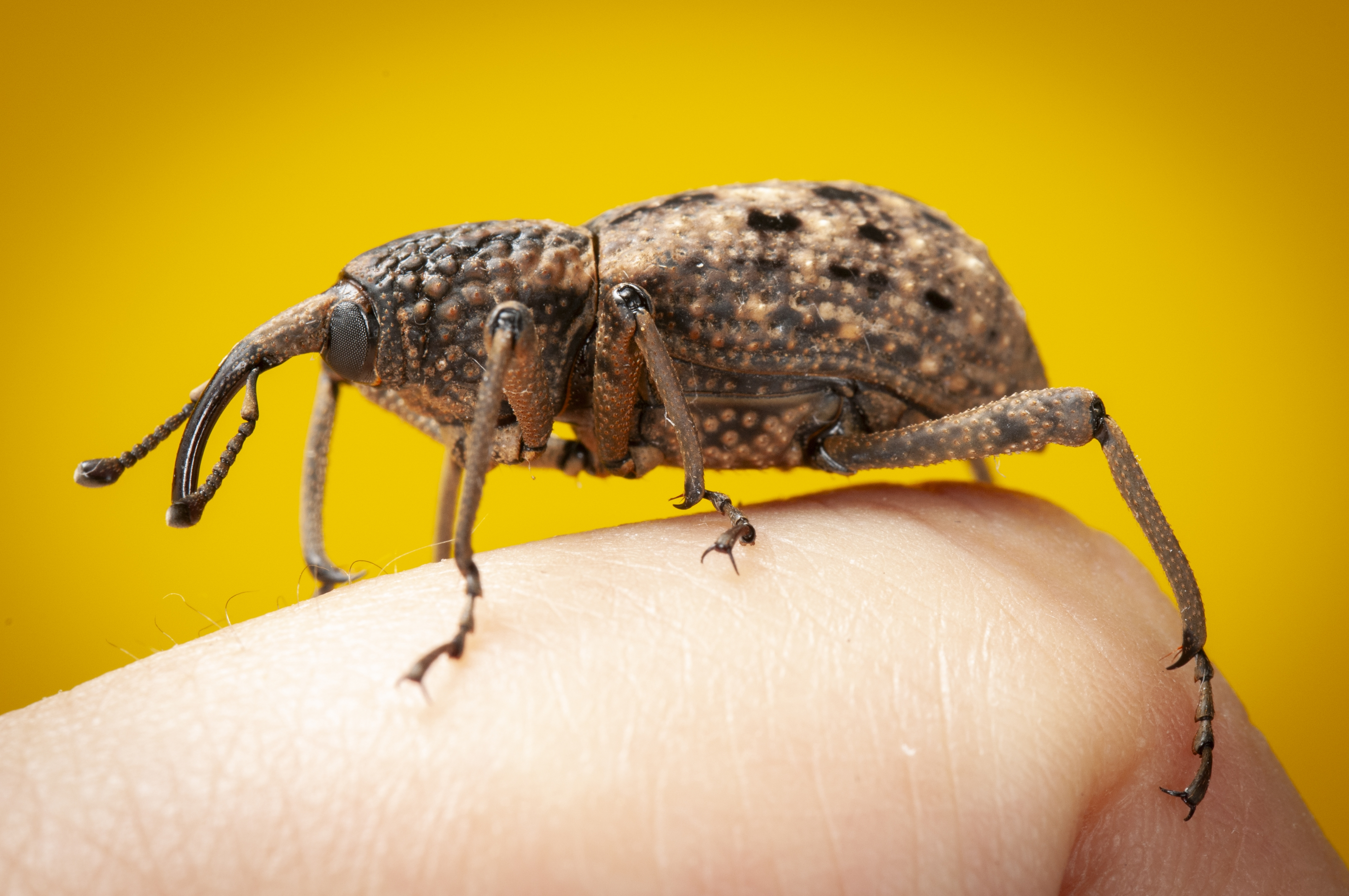
- Sipalinus gigas from Korea

Scientific classification
- Kingdom: Animalia
- Phylum: Arthropoda
- Clade: Pancrustacea
- Class: Insecta
- Order: Coleoptera
- Suborder: Polyphaga
- Infraorder: Cucujiformia
- Superfamily: Curculionoidea
- Family: Curculionidae
- Genus: Sipalinus
- Species: S. gigas

Binomial name
- Sipalinus gigas (Fabricius, 1775)

Synonyms
- Curcuijo gigas Fabricius, 1775; Sipalus hypocrita Boheman, 1845; Sipalus tinctus Walker, 1859; Sipalus chinensis Fairmaire, 1887; Sipalus formosanus Kono, 1934; Calandra granulata Fabricius, 1801; Sipalus misumenus Boheman, 1845; Sipalus cristatus Schaufuss, 1885

= Sipalinus gigas =

Species of beetle

Sipalinus gigas is a species of beetles belonging to the family Curculionidae.

== Description ==
Sipalinus gigas can reach a length of 12–30 millimetres (0.47–1.18 in). The surface is covered with brownish crusty coating. Beak is moderately arcuate and punctured. Pronotum is longer than wide. Elytra shows dark brown stripes with whitish areas bearing tubercles. These beetles are usually found under bark of dying or felled trees and the larvae live in dead or decaying trees.

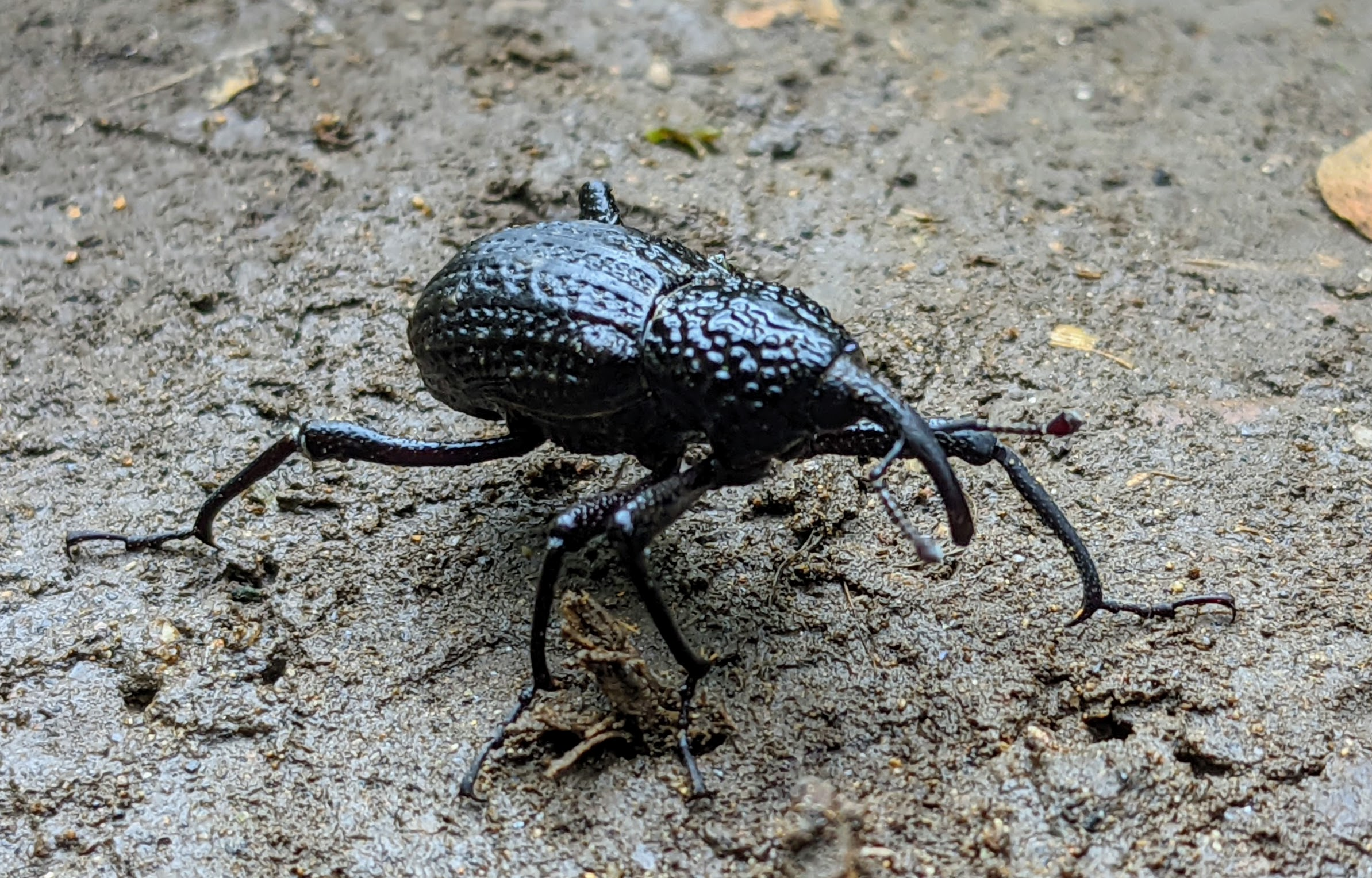
Sipalinus gigas granulatus from New Guinea

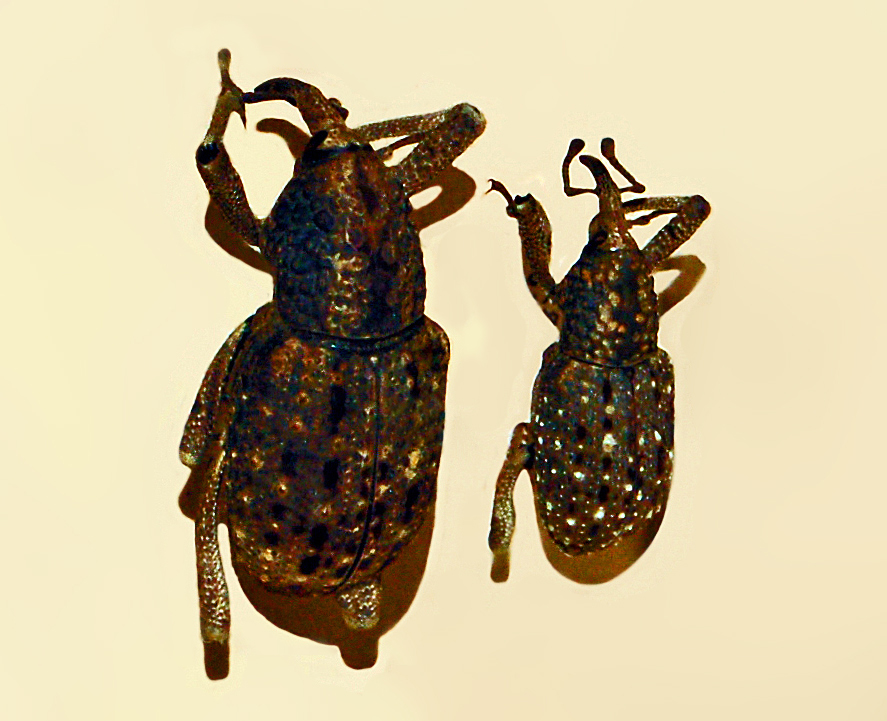

== Subspecies ==
The species can be divided into the following two subspecies:

- Sipalinus gigas gigas (Fabricius, 1775)
- Sipalinus gigas granulatus (Fabricius, 1801)

== Distribution ==
This species can be found in Korea, China, Japan, Himalayas, India and islands of Australasia, from Philippines to New Guinea, Solomon Islands and eastern Australia.
