= Diocalandra =

Scientific classification
- Kingdom: Animalia
- Phylum: Arthropoda
- Clade: Pancrustacea
- Class: Insecta
- Order: Coleoptera
- Suborder: Polyphaga
- Infraorder: Cucujiformia
- Family: Curculionidae
- Subfamily: Dryophthorinae
- Genus: Diocalandra; Faust, 1894

Genus of beetles

Diocalandra is a genus of weevils in the subfamily Dryophthorinae and the monotypic tribe Diocalandrini. Species are distributed mostly in Africa, Asia and Australia and includes the lesser or four-spotted coconut weevil.

== Species ==
The Global Biodiversity Information Facility lists (except for additions as*):

- Diocalandra caelata Marshall, 1948
- Diocalandra crucigera Motschulsky, 1858
- Diocalandra elongata Roelofs, 1875 (* in Alonso-Zarazaga et al. 2023)
- Diocalandra frumenti Fabricius, 1801 - lesser coconut weevil
- Diocalandra impressicollis Csiki, 1936
- Diocalandra kamiyai Morimoto, 1978
- Diocalandra nigromaculata Voss, 1955
- Diocalandra punctigera Csiki, 1936
- Diocalandra reticulata Heller, 1927
- Diocalandra rugosula Marshall, 1952
- Diocalandra sasa Morimoto, 1978
- Diocalandra sechellarum Kolbe, 1910
- Diocalandra stigmaticollis Hustache, 1924
- Diocalandra subfasciatus Csiki, 1936
- Diocalandra subsignata Csiki, 1936
- Diocalandra taitensis Csiki, 1936
