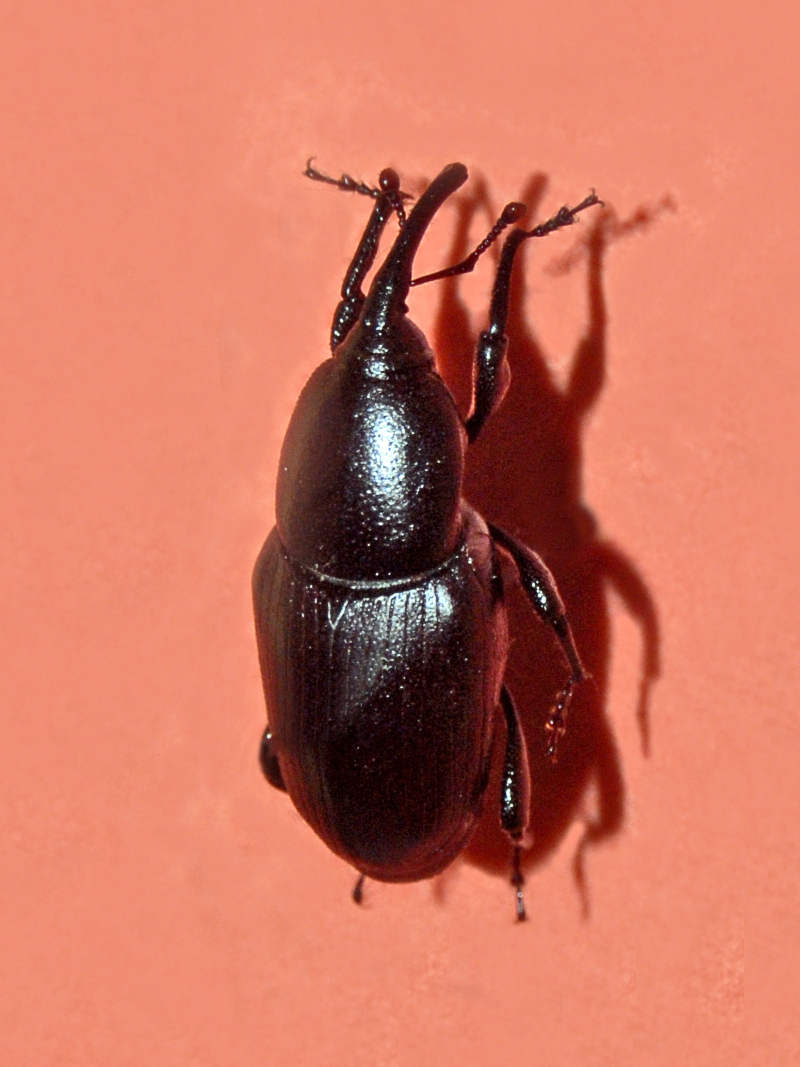
- Museum specimen of Sphenophorus piceus

Scientific classification
- Kingdom: Animalia
- Phylum: Arthropoda
- Class: Insecta
- Order: Coleoptera
- Suborder: Polyphaga
- Infraorder: Cucujiformia
- Family: Curculionidae
- Genus: Sphenophorus
- Species: S. piceus

Binomial name
- Sphenophorus piceus (Pallas 1776)

Synonyms
- Curculio piceus Pallas, 1776; Sphenophorus alaiensis Faust, 1887; Sphenophorus eliconensis Vitale, 1906; Sphenophorus nitens Allard, 1870; Sphenophorus rubidus Rey, 1895; Sphenophorus rufus Salazay-Marso, 1957; Sphenophorus opacus (Gyllenhal) Stierlin, 1882 i; Sphenophorus striatopunctatus (Goeze) Reitter, 1883 i

= Sphenophorus piceus =

Species of beetle

Sphenophorus piceus is a species of palm weevil in the family Curculionidae.

== Description ==
Sphenophorus piceus can reach a length of about 15 millimetres (0.59 in).

== Distribution and habitat ==
This species is widespread from the southern part of Central Europe to the Mediterranean and central Asia. These beetles live on marshy meadows, wet pastures, ponds and lakes.
