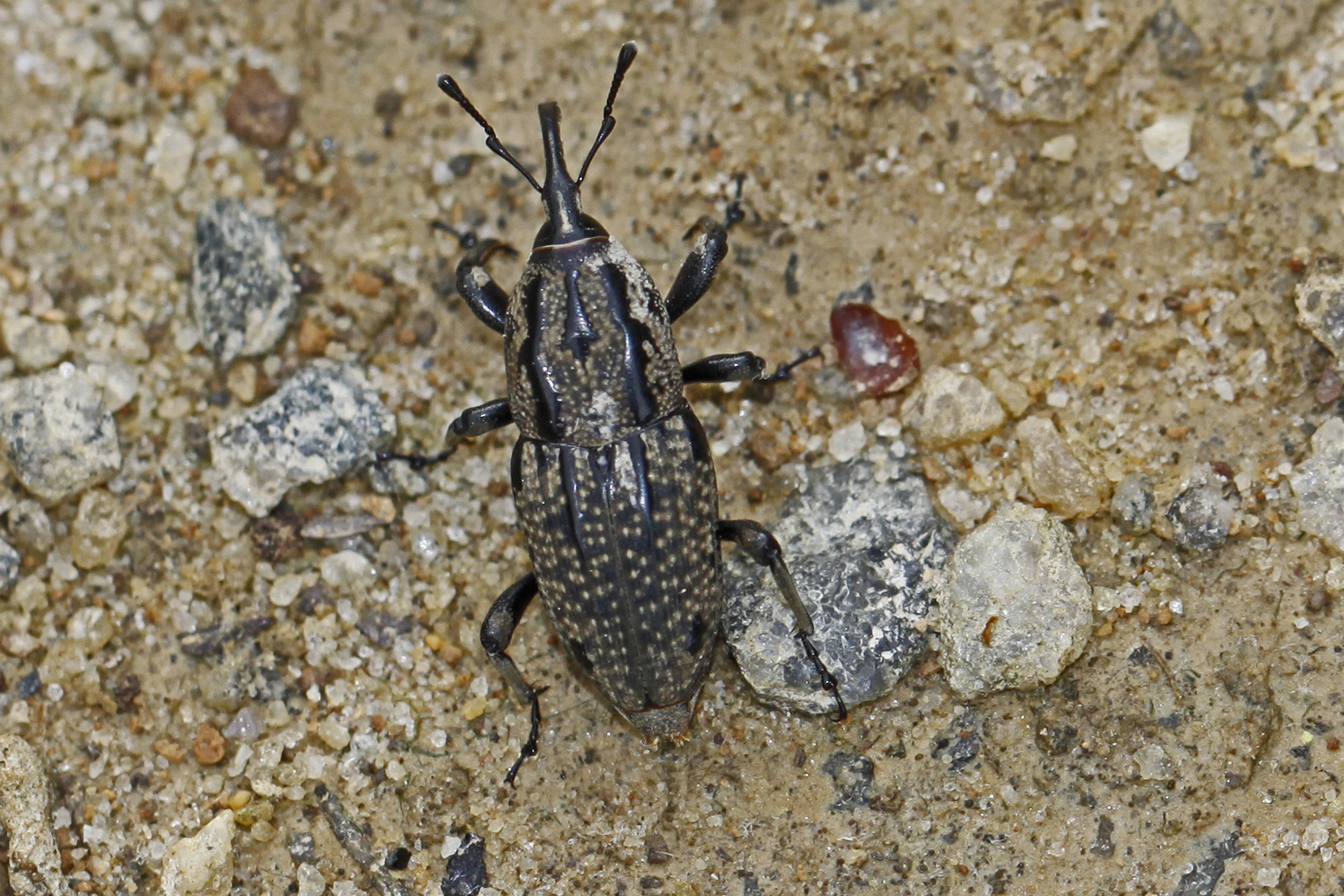
- Sphenophorus cariosus

Scientific classification
- Kingdom: Animalia
- Phylum: Arthropoda
- Class: Insecta
- Order: Coleoptera
- Suborder: Polyphaga
- Infraorder: Cucujiformia
- Family: Curculionidae
- Subfamily: Dryophthorinae
- Tribe: Sphenophorini
- Genus: Sphenophorus; Schönherr, 1838

= Sphenophorus =

Genus of beetles

Sphenophorus is a genus of weevils, often known as billbugs, in the family Curculionidae, and tribe Sphenophorini. Eleven species of billbugs infest managed turfgrass in North America.

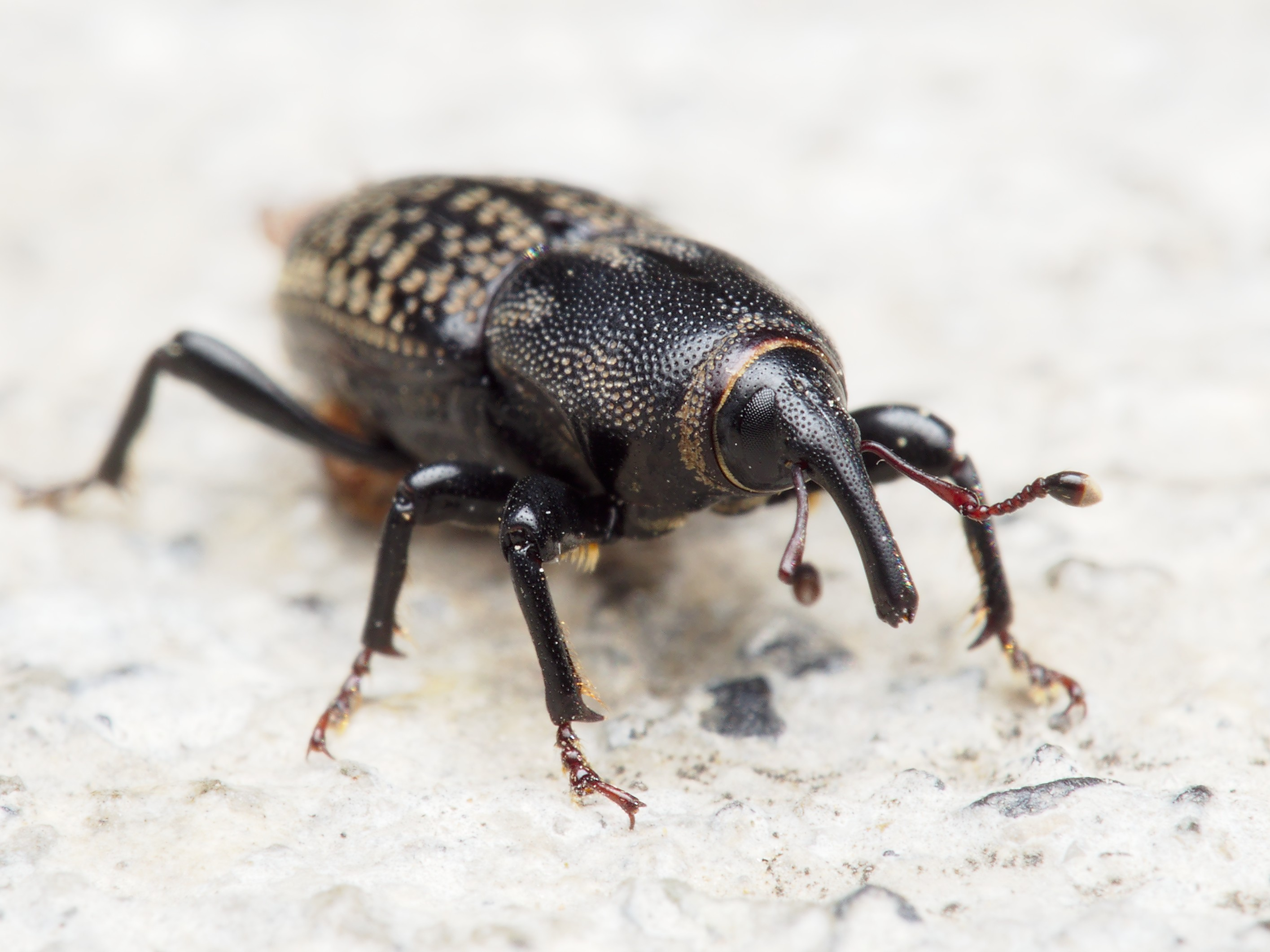
Sphenophorus cicatristriatus

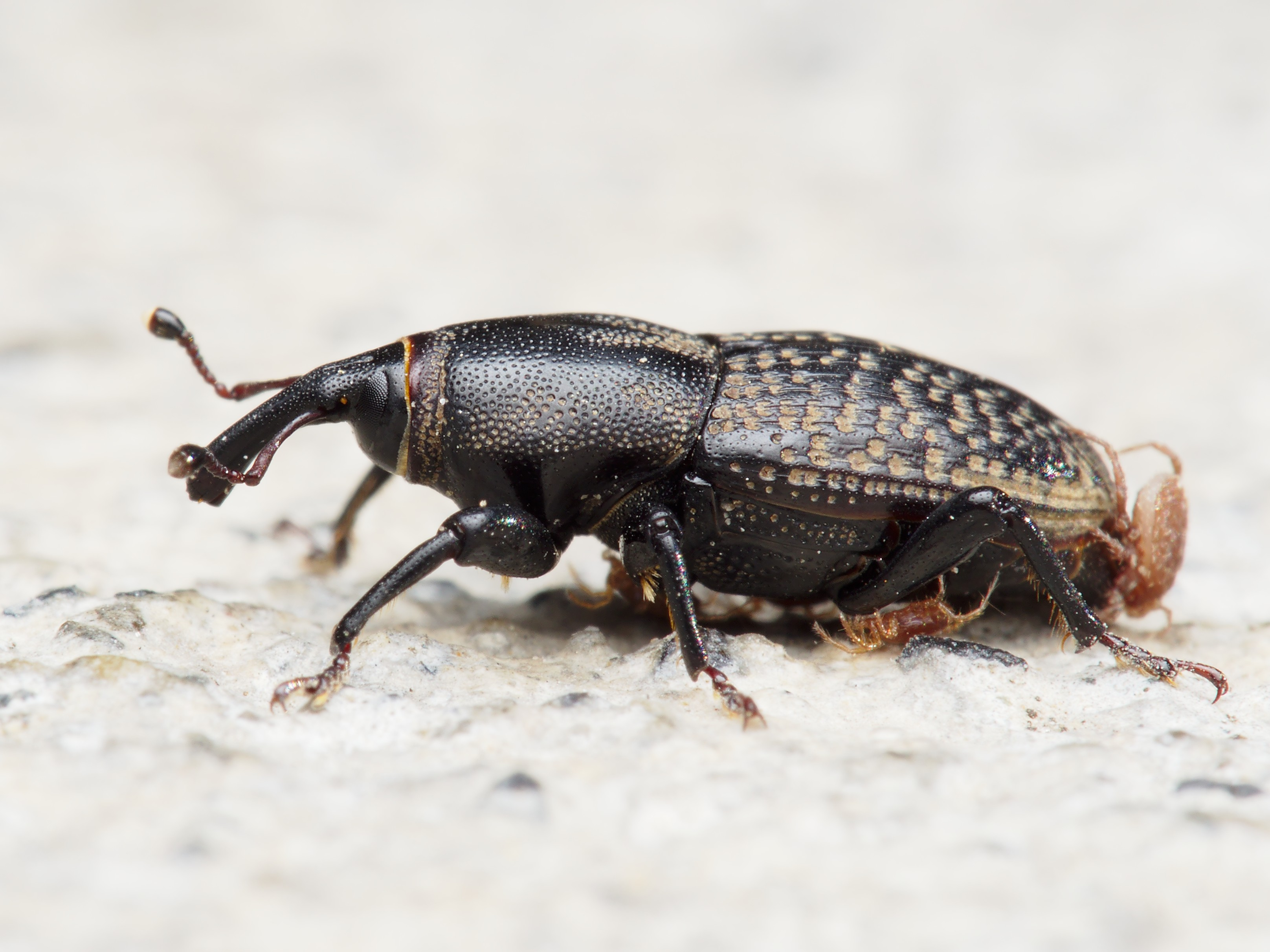
Sphenophorus cicatristriatus

== Species ==
These 278 species belong to the genus Sphenophorus.

- Sphenophorus abbreviatus (J.C. Fabricius, 1787)
- Sphenophorus adspersus Gyllenhal, 1838
- Sphenophorus aduncus Erichson, 1847
- Sphenophorus aequalis Gyllenhal, 1838 (clay-coloured billbug)
- Sphenophorus albicollis Schoenherr, 1838
- Sphenophorus alfurus Heller, 1914
- Sphenophorus ambiguus Gyllenhal, 1838
- Sphenophorus anceps Gyllenhal, 1838
- Sphenophorus angustus Boheman, 1845
- Sphenophorus apicalis LeConte, 1878
- Sphenophorus ardesius Schoenherr, 1839
- Sphenophorus arizonensis Horn, 1873
- Sphenophorus asper Vaurie, 1978
- Sphenophorus aterrimus Champion, 1910
- Sphenophorus atratus Gyllenhal, 1838
- Sphenophorus atrivittata Chittenden, 1924
- Sphenophorus aurofasciatus Brême, 1844
- Sphenophorus austerus Gyllenhal, 1838
- Sphenophorus australis Chittenden, 1905
- Sphenophorus bartramiae Chittenden, 1924
- Sphenophorus basilanus Heller, 1922
- Sphenophorus bifasciatus Gyllenhal, 1838
- Sphenophorus bisbisignatus Gyllenhal, 1838
- Sphenophorus blanchardi Chittenden, 1905
- Sphenophorus blatchleyi Chittenden, 1924
- Sphenophorus brasiliensis Hustache, 1936
- Sphenophorus bruchi Hustache, 1936
- Sphenophorus brunnipennis (E.F. Germar, 1823)
- Sphenophorus brutus Gyllenhal, 1838
- Sphenophorus callizona L.A.A. Chevrolat, 1882
- Sphenophorus callosipennis Chittenden, 1919
- Sphenophorus callosus (Olivier, 1807) (southern corn billbug)
- Sphenophorus canaliculatus Boheman, 1845
- Sphenophorus canalipes Gyllenhal, 1838
- Sphenophorus carbonarius Schoenherr, 1838
- Sphenophorus carinicollis Gyllenhal, 1838
- Sphenophorus cariosus (Olivier, 1807) (nutgrass billbug)
- Sphenophorus caroli Vaurie, 1967
- Sphenophorus castaneipennis Boheman, 1838
- Sphenophorus castanipes Boheman, 1845
- Sphenophorus cazieri Vaurie, 1951
- Sphenophorus chittendeni Blatchley, 1916
- Sphenophorus cicatricosus Schoenherr, 1838
- Sphenophorus cicatripennis Fåhraeus, 1845
- Sphenophorus cicatristriatus Fahraeus, 1838 (Rocky Mountain billbug)
- Sphenophorus cincticollis Gyllenhal, 1838
- Sphenophorus cinctus Gyllenhal, 1838
- Sphenophorus cinerascens V. de Motschulsky, 1858
- Sphenophorus coesifrons Gyllenhal, 1838
- Sphenophorus compressirostris (Say, 1824)
- Sphenophorus confluens J. Prena, 2018
- Sphenophorus contractus Gyllenhal, 1838
- Sphenophorus costatus O.C. Waterhouse, 1879
- Sphenophorus costicollis Chittenden, 1919
- Sphenophorus costifer Chittenden, 1924
- Sphenophorus costipennis Horn, 1873
- Sphenophorus cribricollis F. Walker, 1859
- Sphenophorus cristulatus Hustache, 1936
- Sphenophorus cruciata G. Quedenfeldt, 1888
- Sphenophorus cruciger V. de Motschulsky, 1858
- Sphenophorus crudus Erichson, 1847
- Sphenophorus cultellatus Horn, 1873
- Sphenophorus cultrirostris Gyllenhal, 1838
- Sphenophorus decoratus Gyllenhal, 1838
- Sphenophorus deficiens Chittenden, 1920
- Sphenophorus defrictus Boheman, 1845
- Sphenophorus dehaanii Gyllenhal, 1838
- Sphenophorus delumbatus Boheman, 1845
- Sphenophorus destructor Chittenden, 1905
- Sphenophorus dietrichi (Satterthwait, 1933)
- Sphenophorus dimidiatipennis H. Jekel, 1858
- Sphenophorus discolor Mannerheim, 1843
- Sphenophorus dispar Gyllenhal, 1838
- Sphenophorus diversus Chittenden, 1905
- Sphenophorus dolosus Vaurie, 1978
- Sphenophorus elephantulus Chittenden, 1924
- Sphenophorus ensirostris Schoenherr, 1838
- Sphenophorus erythrurus L.A.A. Chevrolat, 1880
- Sphenophorus exquisita F. Walker, 1859
- Sphenophorus fahraei Gyllenhal, 1838
- Sphenophorus fasciatus Gemminger & Harold, 1871
- Sphenophorus ferrugineus Boheman, 1845
- Sphenophorus flexuosus Gyllenhal, 1838
- Sphenophorus fossor Gyllenhal, 1838
- Sphenophorus foveatus Vaurie, 1978
- Sphenophorus gagatinus Gyllenhal, 1838
- Sphenophorus geminatus Hustache, 1936
- Sphenophorus gentilis LeConte, 1857
- Sphenophorus germari Horn, 1873
- Sphenophorus glabricollis Gyllenhal, 1838
- Sphenophorus glabridiscus F. Walker, 1859
- Sphenophorus glyceriae J. Prena, 2018
- Sphenophorus graminis Chittenden, 1905
- Sphenophorus guttatus Fåhraeus, 1845
- Sphenophorus haneti G. Quedenfeldt, 1888
- Sphenophorus hebetatus Gyllenhal, 1838
- Sphenophorus hemipterus Schoenherr, 1825
- Sphenophorus hoegbergii Boheman, 1845
- Sphenophorus holosericus Chittenden, 1924
- Sphenophorus hypocrita Gyllenhal, 1838
- Sphenophorus immunis (T. Say, 1832)
- Sphenophorus implicatus Gyllenhal, 1838
- Sphenophorus imus Gyllenhal, 1838
- Sphenophorus inaequalis (Say, 1831)
- Sphenophorus incongruus Chittenden, 1905
- Sphenophorus incurrens Gyllenhal, 1838
- Sphenophorus indus (C. Linnaeus, 1758)
- Sphenophorus infelix Gistel, 1848
- Sphenophorus inscripta Gyllenhal, 1838
- Sphenophorus insculptus Gyllenhal, 1838
- Sphenophorus insularis C.H. Boheman, 1859
- Sphenophorus interruptecostata Schaufuss, 1885
- Sphenophorus interstitialis (Say, 1831)
- Sphenophorus intervallatus Chittenden, 1924
- Sphenophorus javanensis Günther, 1937
- Sphenophorus jugosus Chittenden, 1924
- Sphenophorus kuatunensis Voss, 1958
- Sphenophorus laetus Erichson, 1847
- Sphenophorus larvalis Schoenherr, 1838
- Sphenophorus lateritius Gyllenhal, 1838
- Sphenophorus latinasus Horn, 1873
- Sphenophorus latiscapus T. Kirsch, 1869
- Sphenophorus lebasii Gyllenhal, 1838
- Sphenophorus leprosus Fåhraeus, 1845
- Sphenophorus letestui Hustache, 1936
- Sphenophorus leucographus Fåhraeus, 1845
- Sphenophorus levis Vaurie, 1978
- Sphenophorus lineatocollis Gyllenhal, 1838
- Sphenophorus lineatus Champion, 1910
- Sphenophorus liratus Gyllenhal, 1838
- Sphenophorus longicollis Schoenherr, 1838
- Sphenophorus lutulentus Champion, 1910
- Sphenophorus maculata Gyllenhal, 1838
- Sphenophorus maculifer Fåhraeus, 1845
- Sphenophorus maderensis Hoffmann, 1938
- Sphenophorus maidis Chittenden, 1905 (maize billbug)
- Sphenophorus marinus Chittenden, 1905
- Sphenophorus maurus Gyllenhal, 1838
- Sphenophorus melancholicus Gyllenhal, 1838
- Sphenophorus melanocardius Schoenherr, 1838
- Sphenophorus melanocephalus (Fabricius, 1801)
- Sphenophorus melanurus T. Kirsch, 1875
- Sphenophorus memnonius Gyllenhal, 1838
- Sphenophorus meridionalis Gyllenhal, 1838
- Sphenophorus mimelus Vaurie, 1978
- Sphenophorus minimus Hart, 1890 (lesser billbug)
- Sphenophorus missouriensis Chittenden, 1919
- Sphenophorus monilis Gyllenhal, 1838
- Sphenophorus mormon Chittenden, 1904
- Sphenophorus multipunctatus Champion, 1910
- Sphenophorus mundus Champion, 1910
- Sphenophorus musaecola L. Fairmaire, 1898
- Sphenophorus mutilatus Schoenherr, 1838
- Sphenophorus napoanus Hustache, 1936
- Sphenophorus nasutus Chittenden, 1924
- Sphenophorus nawradi T. Kirsch, 1869
- Sphenophorus nebulosus G.C. Champion, 1910
- Sphenophorus necydaloides (Fabricius, 1801)
- Sphenophorus neomexicanus Chittenden, 1904
- Sphenophorus nevadensis Chittenden, 1905
- Sphenophorus nigerrimus Gyllenhal, 1838
- Sphenophorus nigroplagiata G. Quedenfeldt, 1888
- Sphenophorus nubilus Gyllenhal, 1838
- Sphenophorus nudicollis T. Kirsch, 1877
- Sphenophorus obscuripennis Chittenden, 1924
- Sphenophorus obsoletus Gyllenhal, 1838
- Sphenophorus octocostatus Champion, 1910
- Sphenophorus octomaculatus Heller, 1934
- Sphenophorus omissus Blatchley, 1920
- Sphenophorus opacus Gyllenhal, 1838
- Sphenophorus orizabensis L.A.A. Chevrolat, 1882
- Sphenophorus paganus (J.C. Fabricius, 1775)
- Sphenophorus panops Walk. in Mshl., 1920
- Sphenophorus parumpunctatus Gyllenhal, 1838
- Sphenophorus perforatus Fåhraeus, 1845
- Sphenophorus pertinax (Olivier, 1807)
- Sphenophorus phoeniciensis Chittenden, 1904 (phoenix billbug)
- Sphenophorus piceus (P.S. Pallas, 1771)
- Sphenophorus picirostris L. Fairmaire, 1897
- Sphenophorus pinguis Chittenden, 1924
- Sphenophorus placidus Schoenherr, 1838
- Sphenophorus planipennis Gyllenhal, 1838
- Sphenophorus polygrammus Gyllenhal, 1838
- Sphenophorus pontederiae Chittenden, 1905
- Sphenophorus procerus J.L. LeConte, 1858
- Sphenophorus promissa F.P. Pascoe, 1885
- Sphenophorus pulchellus Gyllenhal, 1838
- Sphenophorus pumilus Gyllenhal, 1838
- Sphenophorus punctatostriatus Gyllenhal, 1838
- Sphenophorus punctatus Gyllenhal, 1838
- Sphenophorus pustulosus Gyllenhal, 1838
- Sphenophorus quadrimaculata Gyllenhal, 1838
- Sphenophorus quadrisignatus Gyllenhal, 1838
- Sphenophorus quadrivittatus Gyllenhal, 1838
- Sphenophorus quadrivulnerata J. Thomson, 1858
- Sphenophorus quinquepunctatus Gyllenhal, 1838
- Sphenophorus rectistriatus Chittenden, 1924
- Sphenophorus rectus (Say, 1831)
- Sphenophorus reticulaticollis J. Prena, 2018
- Sphenophorus reticulatus Chittenden, 1924
- Sphenophorus retusus Gyllenhal, 1838
- Sphenophorus rimoratus Gyllenhal, 1838
- Sphenophorus robustior Chittenden, 1905
- Sphenophorus robustus Horn, 1873
- Sphenophorus roelofsi L.A.A. Chevrolat, 1882
- Sphenophorus rubellus Gyllenhal, 1838
- Sphenophorus rufofasciatus Gyllenhal, 1838
- Sphenophorus rufus Szalay Marzsó, 1957
- Sphenophorus rusticus Gyllenhal, 1838
- Sphenophorus sacchari Schoenherr, 1838
- Sphenophorus sanguineus Gyllenhal, 1845
- Sphenophorus sanguinolentus L.A.A. Chevrolat, 1882
- Sphenophorus sationis Heller, 1925
- Sphenophorus saucius Gyllenhal, 1838
- Sphenophorus sayi Gyllenhal, 1838
- Sphenophorus schoenherrii Gyllenhal, 1838
- Sphenophorus schwarzi Chittenden, 1924
- Sphenophorus scirpi Chittenden, 1924
- Sphenophorus scoparius Horn, 1873
- Sphenophorus semicalvus Hustache, 1936
- Sphenophorus senegalensis Gyllenhal, 1838
- Sphenophorus sericans C.H. Boheman, 1845
- Sphenophorus sericeus Gyllenhal, 1838
- Sphenophorus seriepunctatus Gyllenhal, 1838
- Sphenophorus serratipes Chittenden, 1924
- Sphenophorus sierrakowskyi Gyllenhal, 1838
- Sphenophorus signaticollis Gyllenhal, 1838
- Sphenophorus simplex LeConte, 1860
- Sphenophorus soltauii Chittenden, 1905
- Sphenophorus sordidus Schoenherr, 1838
- Sphenophorus spadiceus Gyllenhal, 1838
- Sphenophorus spangleri Anderson, 2014
- Sphenophorus spinolae Gyllenhal, 1838
- Sphenophorus squamosus Boheman, 1845
- Sphenophorus sriatoforatus Gyllenhal, 1838
- Sphenophorus stigmaticus Fåhraeus, 1845
- Sphenophorus strangulatus Gyllenhal, 1838
- Sphenophorus striatipennis Chittenden, 1905
- Sphenophorus striatoforatus Gyllenhal, 1838
- Sphenophorus striatopunctatus (J.A.E. Goeze, 1777)
- Sphenophorus striatus Fåhraeus, 1845
- Sphenophorus strigosus Erichson, 1847
- Sphenophorus subcarinatus Mannerheim, 1843
- Sphenophorus subcostatus L. Fairmaire, 1903
- Sphenophorus sublaevis F.H. Chittenden, 1906
- Sphenophorus subulatus Chittenden, 1905
- Sphenophorus suturalis Gyllenhal, 1838
- Sphenophorus taboa Vanin, 1990
- Sphenophorus tardus Fall, 1901
- Sphenophorus tenuis Vaurie, 1978
- Sphenophorus terebrans Schoenherr, 1838
- Sphenophorus terricola Champion, 1910
- Sphenophorus testardi X. Montrouzier, 1860
- Sphenophorus tetricus Gyllenhal, 1838
- Sphenophorus thoracicus Gyllenhal, 1838
- Sphenophorus tincturata F.P. Pascoe, 1885
- Sphenophorus tomentosus Vaurie, 1978
- Sphenophorus tornowii Brèthes, 1910
- Sphenophorus tredecimpunctatus Schoenherr, 1838
- Sphenophorus tremolerasi Hustache, 1937
- Sphenophorus truncatus Schoenherr, 1838
- Sphenophorus validirostris Gyllenhal, 1838
- Sphenophorus validus J.L. LeConte, 1858
- Sphenophorus variabilis Gyllenhal, 1838
- Sphenophorus variegatus Schoenherr, 1838
- Sphenophorus velutinus LeConte, 1876
- Sphenophorus venatus (Say, 1831) (hunting billbug)
- Sphenophorus vestitus J. Prena, 2018
- Sphenophorus vilis Hustache, 1936
- Sphenophorus villosiventris Chittenden, 1905
- Sphenophorus vittata Chittenden, 1924
- Sphenophorus vomerinus LeConte, 1858
- Sphenophorus zamiae Gyllenhal, 1838
- Sphenophorus zeae Walsh, 1867 (Timothy billbug)
- † Sphenophorus elegans Theobald, 1935
- † Sphenophorus naegelianus O. Heer, 1847
- † Sphenophorus proluviosus Heyden & Heyden, 1866
- † Sphenophorus regelianus O. Heer, 1847
