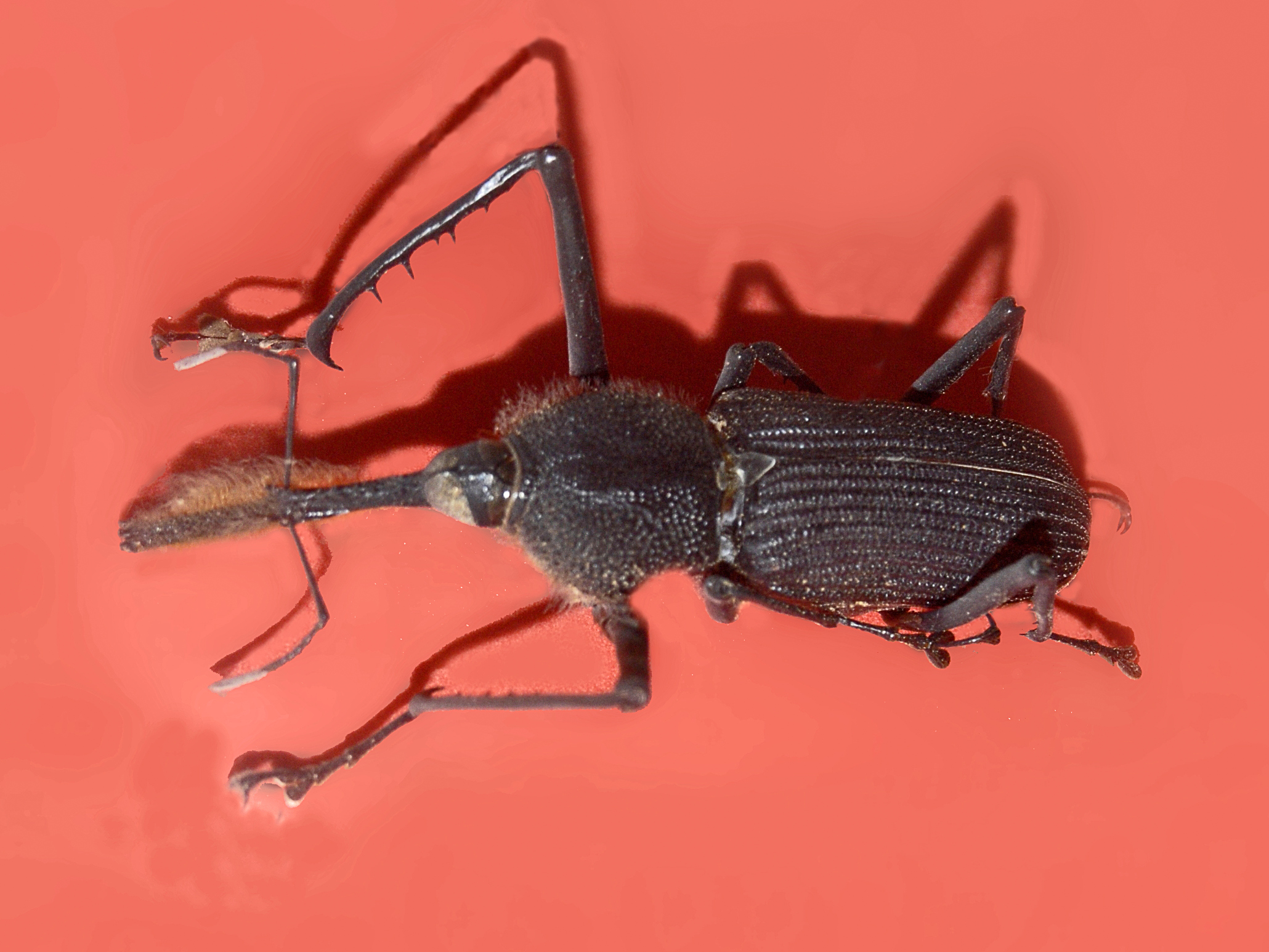
- Museum specimen of Rhinostomus barbirostris

Scientific classification
- Domain: Eukaryota
- Kingdom: Animalia
- Phylum: Arthropoda
- Class: Insecta
- Order: Coleoptera
- Suborder: Polyphaga
- Infraorder: Cucujiformia
- Family: Curculionidae
- Subfamily: Dryophthorinae
- Genus: Rhinostomus; Rafinesque, 1815

Synonyms
- Rhina Latreille, 1806 Homo.; Harpacterus Schoenherr, 1845 Syn.; Harpactericus Agassiz, 1846 Emend.; Harpacteriscus Agassiz, 1846 Lapsus; Rhinus Pierce, 1916 Lapsus

= Rhinostomus =

Genus of beetles

Rhinostomus is a genus of the true weevil family, Curculionidae and the monotypic tribe Rhinostomini. They include "yucca weevils" and were previously placed in a genus called Yuccaborus; in 2002, this was determined to be a taxonomic synonym of Rhinostomus, and the species, Y. frontalis, was moved to the genus Rhinostomus.

== Species ==
- Rhinostomus barbirostris
- Rhinostomus frontalis - formerly Yuccaborus frontalis
- Rhinostomus meldolae
- Rhinostomus niger
- Rhinostomus oblitus
- Rhinostomus quadrisignatus
- Rhinostomus scrutator
- Rhinostomus thompsoni
