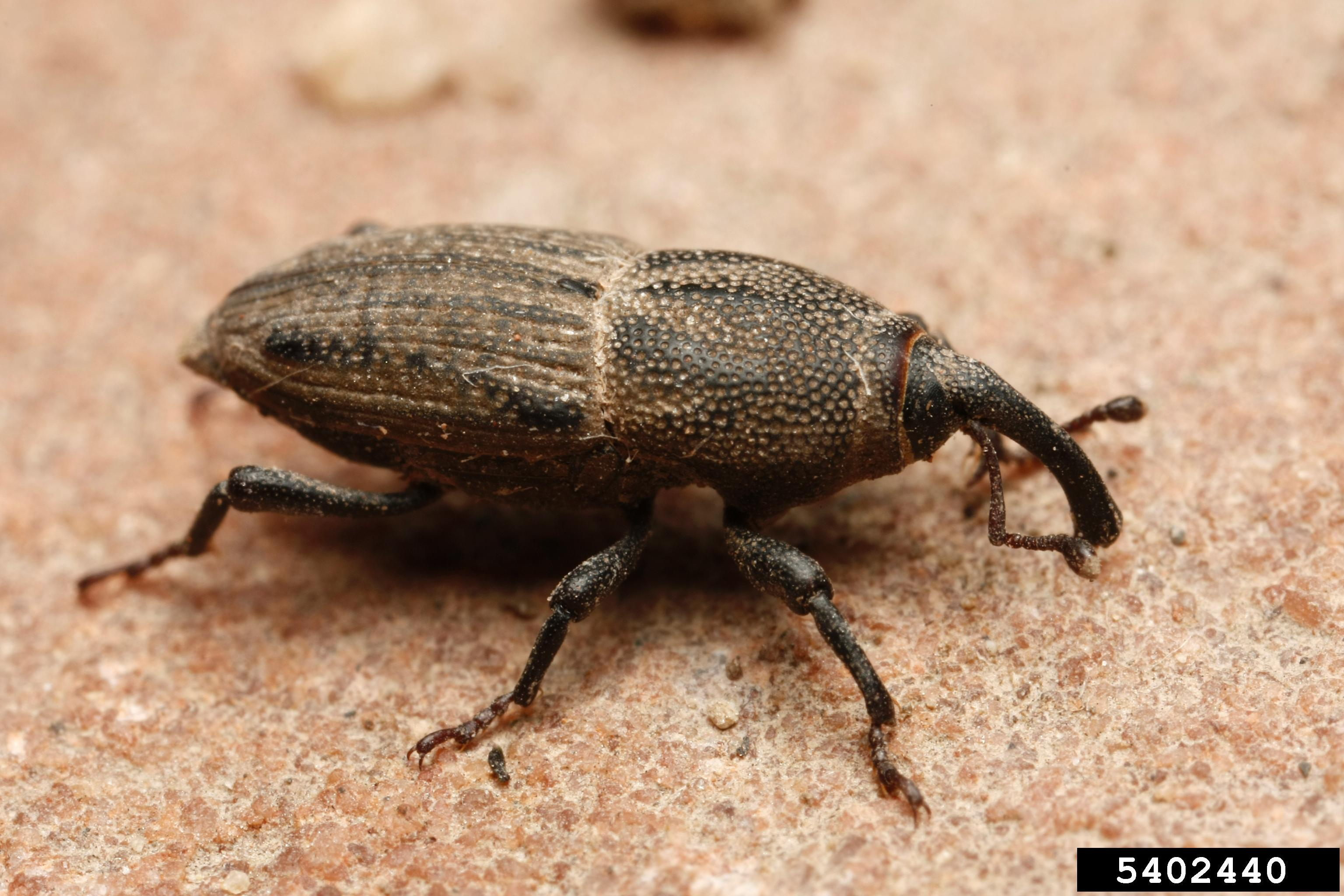

Scientific classification
- Kingdom: Animalia
- Phylum: Arthropoda
- Class: Insecta
- Order: Coleoptera
- Suborder: Polyphaga
- Infraorder: Cucujiformia
- Family: Curculionidae
- Genus: Sphenophorus
- Species: S. parvulus

Binomial name
- Sphenophorus parvulus Gyllenhal, 1838

Synonyms
- Sphenophorus pumilus Gyllenhal, 1838

= Sphenophorus parvulus =

Species of beetle

Sphenophorus parvulus, commonly known as the bluegrass billbug, is a species of beetle in the true weevil family Curculionidae. It is found in North America, especially in the eastern United States. It is a pest of Kentucky bluegrass, corn and grain crops.

== Taxonomy ==
Swedish entomologist Leonard Gyllenhaal described the organism in 1838. The species name is derived from the Latin adjective parvus "small".

== Description ==
The adult bluegrass billbug is about 0.25 in (0.6 cm) in length, a third of which is the long, downward-curving snout or proboscis. The thorax bears deep puncture marks and the elytra have longitudinal grooves. These billbugs are usually some shade of brown, grey or black.

== Distribution and habitat ==
The bluegrass billbug is native to North America. Its range extends from Ontario and Nova Scotia southwards to Idaho, New Mexico and Florida. It is commonest in the east of its range. It is found in grassland, including lawns, especially in association with Kentucky bluegrass, as well as in corn and other grain crops.

== Ecology ==
The adult beetle feeds on seedlings and tender young shoots of various grasses. It seldom flies, preferring to scramble among the crop plants. Although Kentucky bluegrass seems to be its favored host plant, it will also feed on timothy-grass, redtop grass, maize, wheat and other small grain crops. Its feeding leaves a characteristic row of identical small holes across an unfolding leaf-blade. Breeding takes place in the late spring and there is a single generation. The female chews a hole in the stem of a grass plant and deposits a single egg inside. The developing white, legless, larva hollows out the inside of the stem and feeds around the root crown. The plant often wilts, and can be distorted, weakened or even killed by the actions of adults and larvae. When fully developed, the larva pupates, either in the stem or in the soil, and overwinters as an adult or as a pre-emergent adult inside the pupal case. Adult females may lay between 40 and 200 eggs over the course of one to three months.
