= Frank Hurlbut Chittenden =

American entomologist

Frank Hurlbut Chittenden (3 November 1858 – 15 September 1929) was an American coleopterist and economic entomologist who worked in the US Department of Entomology.

== Life ==
Chittenden was born in Cleveland, Ohio but the family moved to Elyria. He lost his father when he was young and was taken care of by his school-teacher mother. He went to Cornell University but unfortunately for Chittenden, the well-known entomology professor at Cornell, John Henry Comstock was then away in Washington. Chittenden, sponsored by William J. Holland of the Carnegie Museum, found himself studying under W.S. Barnard, who was less experienced in entomology than himself. This led to Barnard being displeased and led to Chittenden leaving with a licenciate degree in 1881 instead of a bachelor's degree. He then lived in Brooklyn and worked at the Brooklyn Museum, and worked as an editor of the Entomologica Americana. He was a founder of the Brooklyn Entomological Society. In 1891 he joined the US Department of Agriculture working as an economic entomologist. He wrote numerous departmental bulletins and several books. He received an honorary doctorate from the University of Pittsburgh (then called the Western University of Pennsylvania) in 1904.

Chittenden took a special interest in weevils and described a few species, particularly in the genus Sphenophorus. He also described 30 species in the genus Curculio, many of which are no longer considered valid.

Chittenden never married and for many years, his mother lived with him and after her death, his widowed sister.

== Publications ==
Chittenden wrote several USDA publications on insects pests, these include:

- (1898). The Fruit-tree bark-beetle (Scolytus rugulosus Ratz.).
- (1899). Some insects injurious to garden and orchard crops : a series of articles dealing with insects of this class.
- (1901). The fall army worm and variegated cutworm.
- (1905). The corn root-worms.
- (1906). The Melon Aphis.
- (1907). The larger Apple-tree borers.
- (1907). The Colorado potato beetle (Leptinotarsa decemlineata Say).
- (1908). The Squash-vine borer (Melittia satyriniformis Hbn.).
- (1908). The Nut Weevils.
- (1908). The Rose Slug.
- (1909). The Pea Aphis.
- (1909). The green-striped maple worm. (Anisota rubicunda Fab.). (w. L.O. Howard)
- (1909). Two-Lined Chestnut Borer (Agrilus Bilineatus Weber.).
- (1909). The striped cucumber beetle (Diabrotica vittata Fab.)
- (1909). The leopard moth. (Zeuzera pyrina Fab.). (w. L.O. Howard)
- (1911). The Fig Moth.
- (1912). The larger canna leaf-roller. (Calpodes ethlius Cram).
- (1912). The potato-tuber moth. (Phthorimaea operculella Zell.), A preliminary account.
- (1913). The rose slug-caterpillar.
- (1913). The Abutilon Moth.
- (1919). https://archive.org/details/ricemoth783chit The Rice Moth.]

Some of his work was also compiled into books.

- (1909). Insects injurious to vegetables. New York: Orange Judd Company.
- with L.O. Howard and C.L. Marlatt The principal household insects of the United States. (1899)
