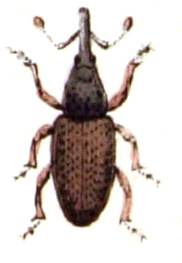
- Dryophthorus corticalis

Scientific classification
- Domain: Eukaryota
- Kingdom: Animalia
- Phylum: Arthropoda
- Class: Insecta
- Order: Coleoptera
- Suborder: Polyphaga
- Infraorder: Cucujiformia
- Clade: Phytophaga
- Superfamily: Curculionoidea
- Family: Curculionidae
- Subfamily: Dryophthorinae; Schönherr, 1825

= Dryophthorinae =

Subfamily of weevils

Dryophthorinae is a weevil subfamily within the family Curculionidae. While it is not universally accepted as distinct from other curculionid subfamilies, at least one major recent revision elevated it to family rank, as Dryophthoridae

== Tribes ==
- Cryptodermatini (monotypic)
  - Cryptoderma
- Dryophthorini

=== Tribe group "Orthognathinae" ===
- Orthognathini
- Rhinostomini (monotypic)
  - Rhinostomus (includes Yuccaborus)

=== Tribe group "Rhynchophorinae" ===
- Diocalandrini (monotypic)
  - Diocalandra
- Litosomini
  - includes Sitophilus Schönherr, 1838
- Ommatolampini
  - Aphiocephalus
  - Cylindrodcyba
  - Lampommatus
  - Ommatolampes
- Polytini (monotypic)
  - Polytus
- Rhynchophorini
- Sphenophorini

=== Tribe group "Stromboscerinae" ===
- Stromboscerini

=== Tribe uncertain ===
- Barystethus
