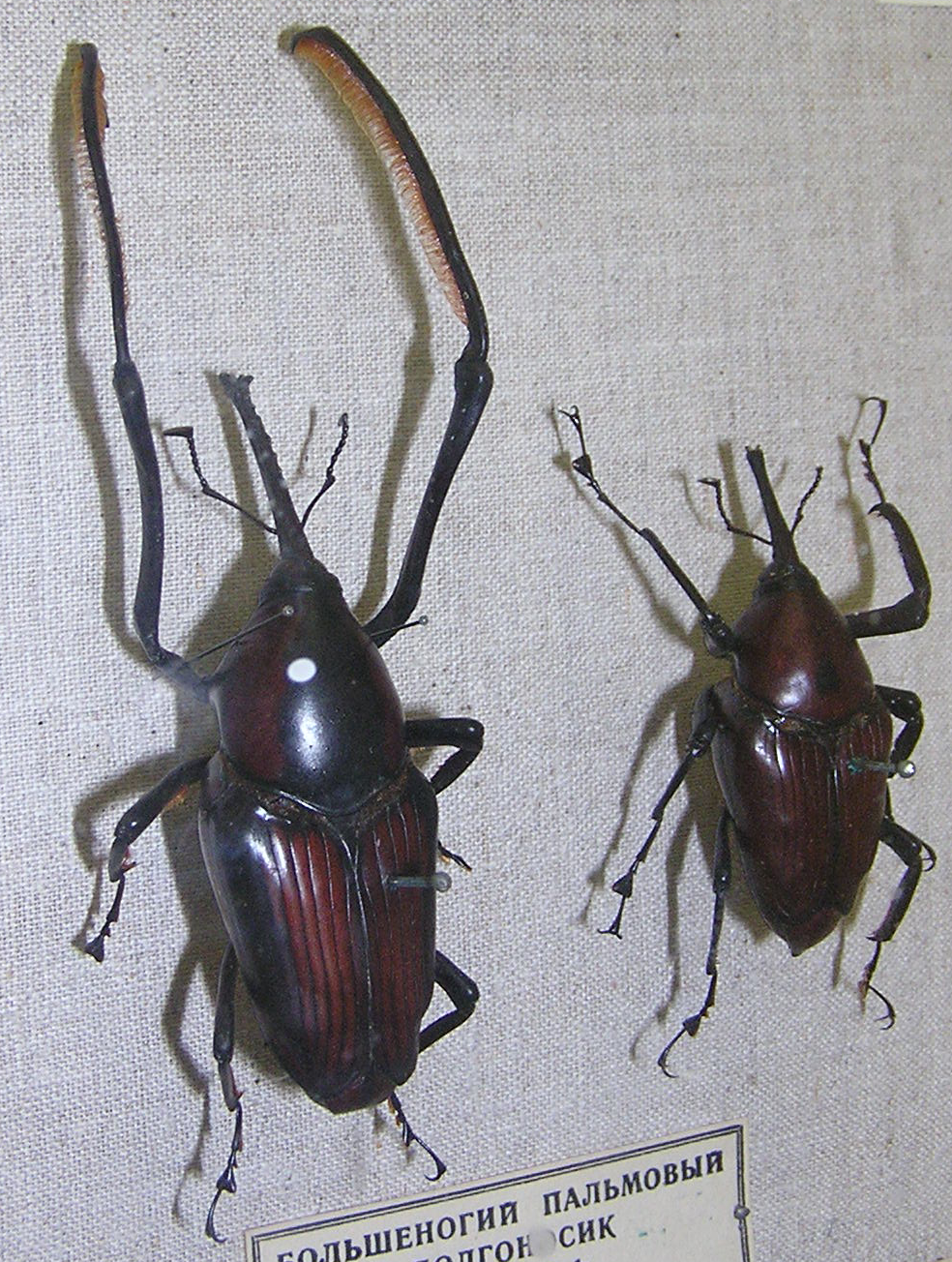
- Male (left) and female specimens of Cyrtotrachelus dux

Scientific classification
- Kingdom: Animalia
- Phylum: Arthropoda
- Clade: Pancrustacea
- Class: Insecta
- Order: Coleoptera
- Suborder: Polyphaga
- Infraorder: Cucujiformia
- Superfamily: Curculionoidea
- Family: Curculionidae
- Subfamily: Dryophthorinae
- Tribe: Rhynchophorini; Schönherr, 1838

= Rhynchophorini =

Tribe of beetles

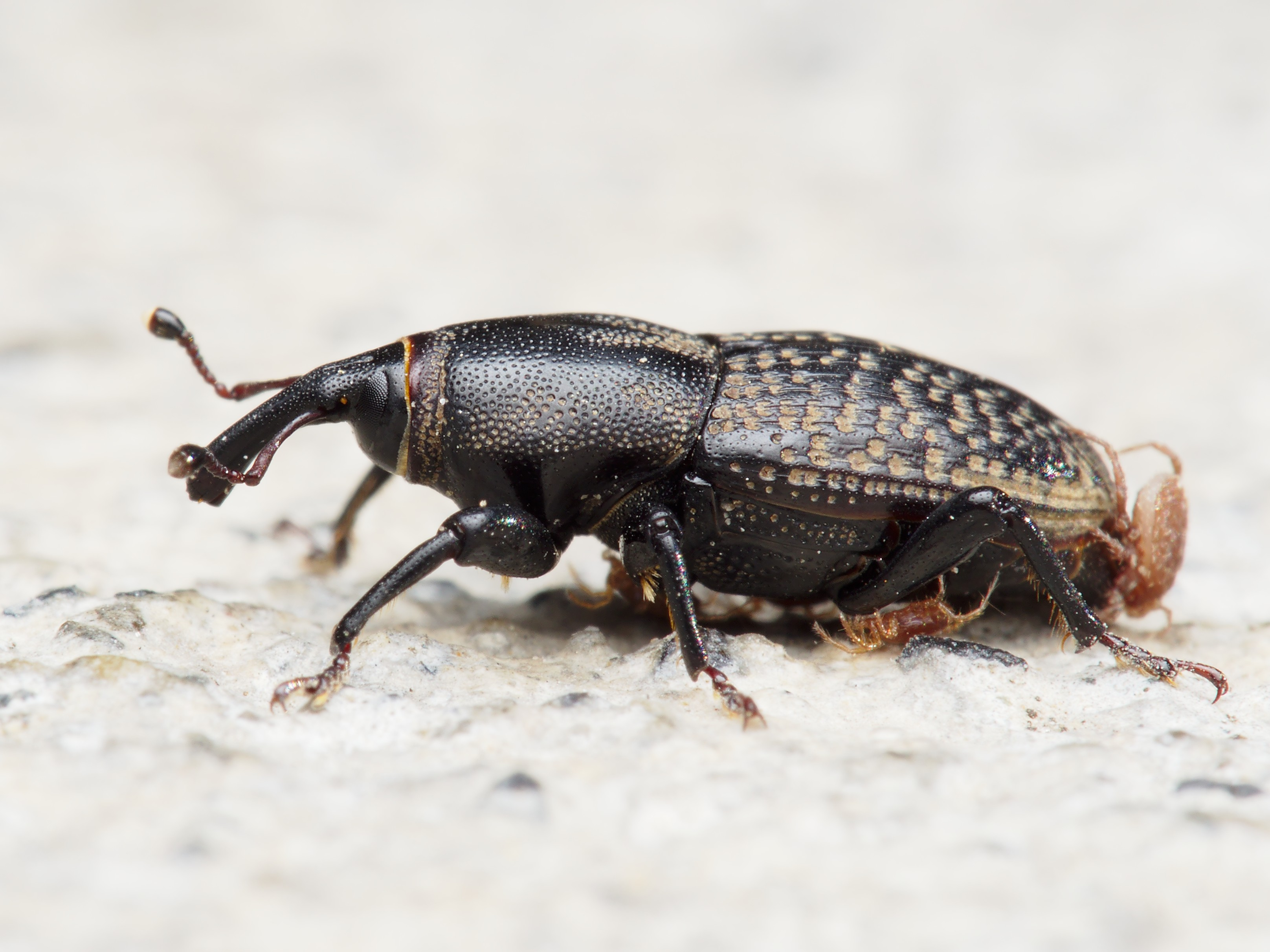
Sphenophorus cicatristriatus, Rocky Mountain Billbug

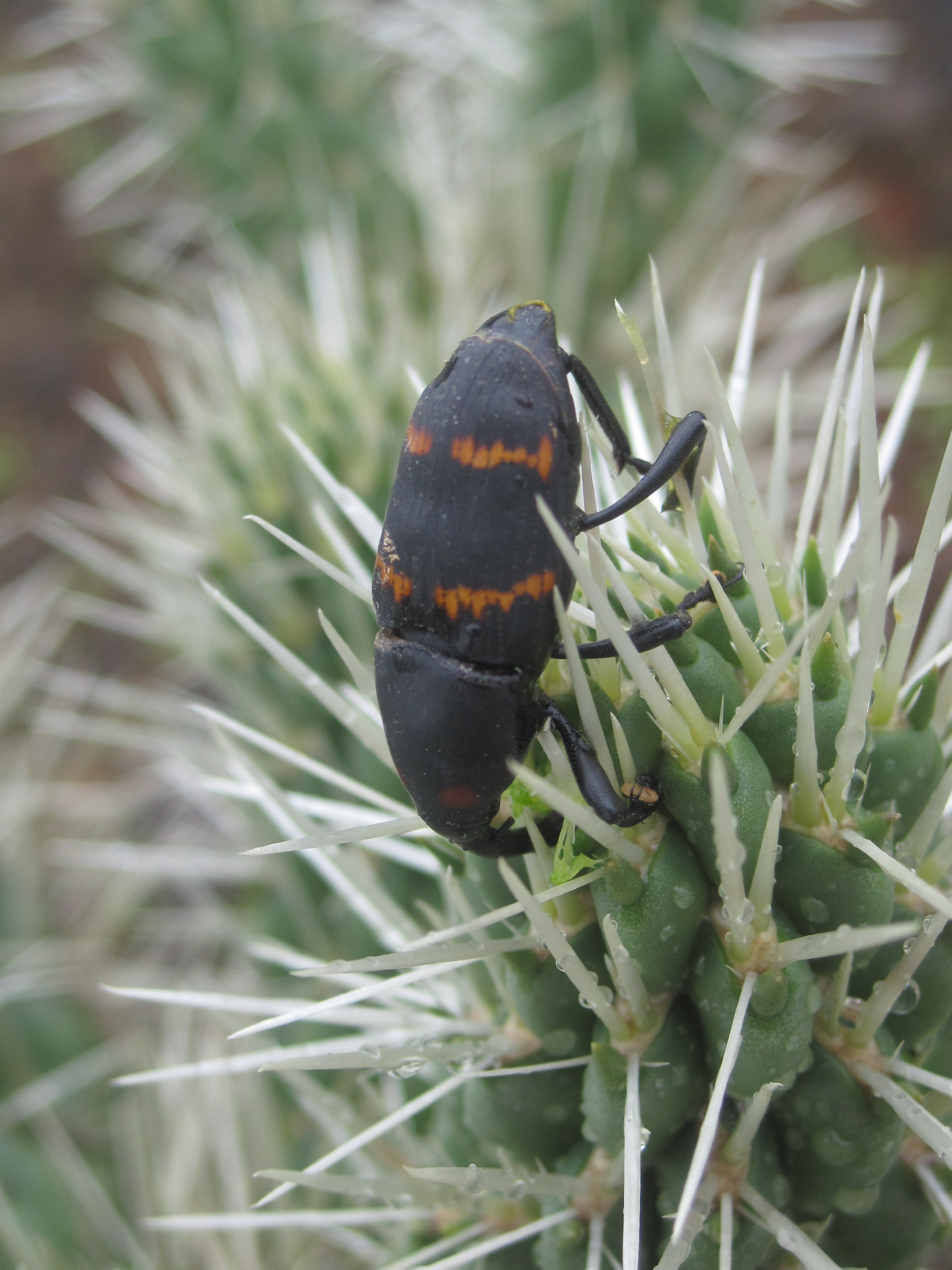
Cactophagus spinolae, Cactus weevil from Teotihuacan

The tribe Rhynchophorini is the largest member of the true weevil subfamily Dryophthorinae. Alonso-Zarazaga and Lyal (1999) treated it as a distinct subfamily, Rhynchophorinae (in the family Dryophthoridae). Weevils of this tribe have the pygidium (VII abdominal tergite) not covered by the elytra.

This tribe includes the largest weevils of the subfamily and includes important pests, such as Sitophilus (grain weevils) and palm weevils in the genus Rhynchophorus:

- Rhynchophorus palmarum – American Palm Weevil
- Rhynchophorus ferrugineus – Red Palm Weevil
- Rhynchophorus cruentatus – Palmetto Weevil.

== Subtribes and genera ==
BioLib includes:

subtribe Diocalandrina Zimmerman, 1993

1. Diocalandra Faust, 1894
2. Myocalandra Faust, 1894

subtribe Litosomina Lacordaire, 1865

1. Autonopis Pascoe, 1874
2. Calandrotopus Faust, 1899
3. Daisya Anderson, 2003
4. Eucalandra Faust, 1899
5. Fursovia Alonso-Zarazaga & Lyal, 1999
6. Ganae Pascoe, 1885
7. Laogenia Pascoe, 1874
8. Melchus Lacordaire, 1866
9. Microspathe Faust, 1899
10. Neophrynoides O'Brien & Wibmer, 1982
11. Sitophilus Schönherr, 1838
12. Stockwellius Anderson, 2018
13. Toxorhinus Lacordaire, 1866
14. Tryphetus Faust, 1894

subtribe Ommatolampina Lacordaire, 1865

1. Lampommatus Heller, 1896
2. Ommatolampes Schoenherr, 1838

subtribe Polytina Zimmerman, 1993

1. Polytus Faust, 1894

subtribe Rhynchophorina Schoenherr, 1833

1. Cyrtotrachelus Schönherr, 1838
2. Macrocheirus Schönherr, 1838
3. Mahakamia Ritsema, 1913
4. Omotemnus Chevrolat, 1883
5. Otidognathus Lacordaire, 1865
6. Protocerius Schönherr, 1838
7. Rhynchophorus Herbst, 1795

subtribe Sphenophorina Lacordaire, 1865

1. Abacobius Lacordaire, 1866
2. Acantharhinus Schoenherr, 1838
3. Acherus Roelofs, 1891
4. Adapanetus Günther, 1936
5. Aeetes Alonso-Zarazaga & Lyal, 1999
6. Alloscolytroproctus Hustache, 1929
7. Anapygus Kirsch, 1875
8. Anathymus Pascoe, 1885
9. Anoxyopisthen Kolbe, 1889
10. Aphanomastix Heller, 1904
11. Aplotes Chevrolat, 1885
12. Aporophemus Günther, 1941
13. Atarphaeus Günther, 1937
14. Barystethus Lacordaire, 1866
15. Belopoeus Schoenherr, 1838
16. Belorhynus Guerin-Meneville, 1833
17. Billbergia Blackwelder, 1947
18. Cactophagus LeConte, 1876
19. Cercidocerus Guérin-Méneville, 1833
20. Conopisthen Faust, 1895
21. Coptopisthen Kolbe, 1899
22. Coraliphorus Chevrolat, 1883
23. Cosmopolites Chevrolat, 1885
24. Cryptocordylus Faust, 1895
25. Cyrtomasius Vanin, 1998
26. Diathetes Pascoe, 1874
27. Disodontogenus Marshall, 1909
28. Dolichopisthen Kolbe, 1899
29. Foveolus Vaurie, 1968
30. Gnamptorrhinus Marshall, 1949
31. Haplorhynchus Aurivillius, 1886
32. Heterotoxus Lacordaire, 1866
33. Ichthyopisthen Roelofs, 1892
34. Iphthimorhinus Roelofs, 1892
35. Korotyaevius Alonso-Zarazaga & Lyal, 1999
36. Liocalandra Chevrolat, 1881
37. Megastethus Faust, 1899
38. Meroplus Chevrolat, 1885
39. Metamasius Horn, 1876
40. Metaprodioctes Günther, 1937
41. Nassophasis C.O. Waterhouse, 1879
42. Nea (beetle) K.M.Heller, 1900
43. Neos (beetle) Marshall, 1943
44. Odoiporus Chevrolat, 1885
45. Oresiorrhinus Voss, 1975
46. †Oryctorhinus Scudder, 1893
47. Paramasius Kuschel, 1958
48. Perissoderes C.O. Waterhouse, 1879
49. Phacecorynes Schoenherr, 1845
50. Platyopisthen Roelofs, 1892
51. Pleurothorax Chevrolat, 1883
52. Poteriophorus Schönherr, 1838
53. Procosmopolites Hustache, 1922
54. Prodioctes Pascoe, 1874
55. Pseudacanthorrhinus Heller, 1924
56. Rhabdoscelus G.A.K. Marshall, 1943
57. Rhinocles Dohrn, 1875
58. Rhinogrypus Roelofs, 1893
59. Rhodobaenus LeConte, 1876
60. Rhynchophorinus Günther, 1937
61. Schlaginhaufenia Heller, 1910
62. †Sciabregma Scudder, 1893
63. Scoliopisthen Hartmann, 1900
64. Scyphophorus Schönherr, 1838
65. Sipalomimus Voss, 1958
66. Sparganobasis Marshall, 1915
67. Sphenocorynes Schönherr, 1838
68. Sphenophorus Schönherr, 1838 - Billbug
69. Stenophida Pascoe, 1866
70. Tapinostethus Faust, 1894
71. Temnoschoita Chevrolat, 1885
72. Tetratopos Chevrolat, 1883
73. Trigonotarsus Guérin-Méneville, 1833
74. Trochorhopalus Kirsch, 1877
75. Trymatoderus Fairmaire, 1889
76. Tyndides Pascoe, 1874
77. Zetheus Pascoe, 1874

subtribe not placed

1. Abrachius Roelofs, 1892
2. Dynamis (beetle) Chevrolat, 1883
3. Koreguajus Anderson & Bermúdez Higinio, 2022
4. Paratasis Chevrolat, 1883
