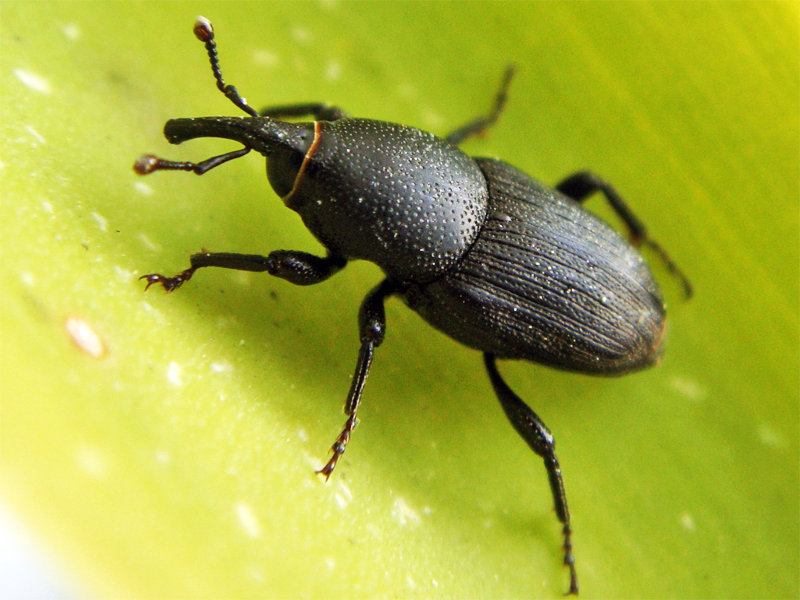
- Sphenophorus striatopunctatus

Scientific classification
- Kingdom: Animalia
- Phylum: Arthropoda
- Clade: Pancrustacea
- Class: Insecta
- Order: Coleoptera
- Suborder: Polyphaga
- Infraorder: Cucujiformia
- Superfamily: Curculionoidea
- Family: Curculionidae
- Subfamily: Dryophthorinae
- Tribe: Sphenophorini; Lacordaire, 1865

Synonyms
- Sphenophorina Lacordaire, 1865

= Sphenophorini =

Tribe of beetles

The Sphenophorini are an important tribe of weevils in the subfamily Dryophthorinae; however, BioLib places this taxon at the subtribe level.

== Genera ==
- Abacobius Lacordaire, 1866
- Acantharhinus Schönherr, 1838
- Acherus Roelofs, 1891
- Adapanetus Guenther, 1936
- Aeetes Alonso-Zarazaga & Lyal, 1999
- Alloscolytroproctus Hustache, 1929
- Anapygus Kirsch, 1875 circa
- Anathymus Pascoe, 1885
- Anoxyopisthen Kolbe, 1889
- Aphanomastix Heller, 1904
- Aplotes Chevrolat, 1885
- Aporophemus Guenther, 1941
- Atarphaeus Guenther, 1937 circa
- Barystethus Lacordaire, 1866
- Belopoeus Schönherr, 1838
- Belorhynus Guérin-Méneville, 1833
- Billbergia Blackwelder, 1947
- Cactophagoides Champion, 1910

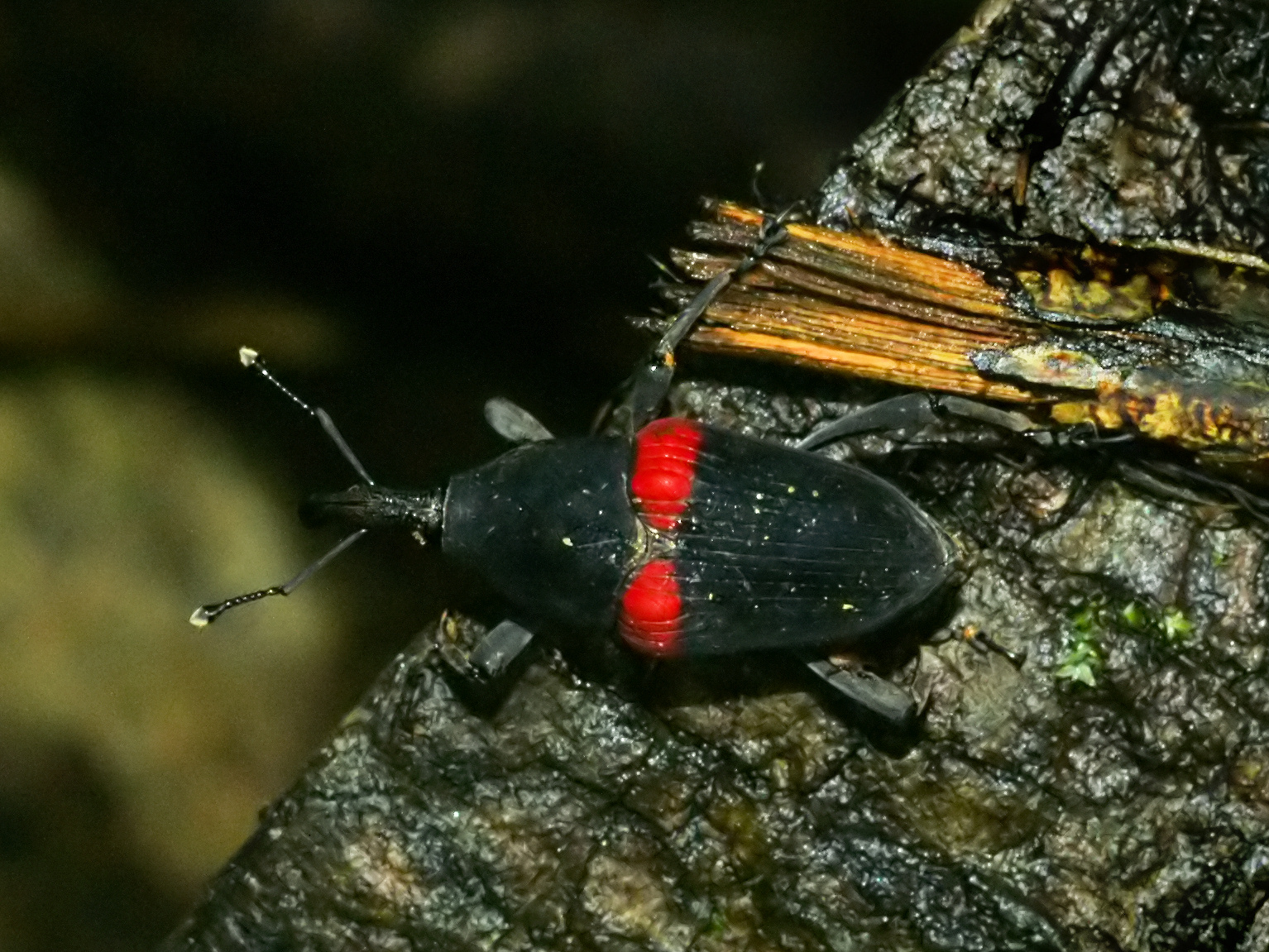
Cactophagus sanguinolentus

- Cactophagus LeConte, 1876
- Cercidocerus Guérin-Méneville, 1833
- Conopisthen Faust, 1895
- Coptopisthen Kolbe, 1899
- Coraliphorus Chevrolat, 1883
- Cosmopolites Chevrolat, 1885
- Cryptocordylus Faust, 1895
- Cyrtomasius Vanin, 1998
- Diathetes Pascoe, 1874
- Disodontogenus Marshall, 1909
- Dolichopisthen Kolbe, 1899
- Foveolus Vaurie, 1968
- Gnamptorrhinus Marshall, 1949
- Haplorhynchus Aurivillius, 1886
- Heterotoxus Lacordaire, 1866
- Ichthyopisthen Roelofs, 1892
- Iphthimorhinus Roelofs, 1892
- Korotyaevius Alonso-Zarazaga & Lyal, 1999
- Liocalandra Chevrolat, 1881
- Megastethus Faust, 1899
- Meroplus Chevrolat, 1885
- Metamasius Horn, 1876
- Metaprodioctes Guenther, 1937
- Nassophasis C.O. Waterhouse, 1879
- Neos Marshall, 1943
- Odoiporus Chevrolat, 1885
- Oresiorrhinus Voss, 1975
- Oryctorhinus Scudder, 1893
- Paradiaphorus Chevrolat, 1885
- Paramasius Kuschel, 1958
- Paraprodioctes Voss, 1958
- Perissoderes CO Waterhouse, 1879
- Phacecorynes Schönherr, 1845
- Platyopisthen Roelofs, 1892
- Pleurothorax Chevrolat, 1883
- Poteriophorus Schönherr, 1838
- Procosmopolites Hustache, 1922
- Prodioctes Pascoe, 1874
- Pseudacanthorrhinus Heller, 1924
- Rhabdoscelus Marshall, 1943
- Rhinocles Dohrn, 1875
- Rhinogrypus Roelofs, 1893
- Rhodobaenus LeConte, 1876
- Schlaginhaufenia Heller, 1910
- Sciabregma Scudder, 1893
- Scoliopisthen Hartmann, 1900
- Scyphophorus Schönherr, 1838
- Sipalomimus Voss, 1958
- Sparganobasis Marshall, 1915
- Sphenocorynes Schönherr, 1838
- Sphenophorus Schönherr, 1826
- Stenophida Pascoe, 1866
- Tapinostethus Faust, 1894
- Temnoschoita Chevrolat, 1885
- Tetratopos Chevrolat, 1883
- Trigonotarsus Guérin-Méneville, 1833
- Trochorhopalus Kirsch, 1877
- Trymatoderus Fairmaire, 1889
- Tyndides Pascoe, 1874
- Zetheus Pascoe, 1874
