= List of Rhodobaenus species =

This is a list of 131 species in the genus Rhodobaenus.

== Rhodobaenus species ==
- Rhodobaenus adspersus Champion, G.C., 1910
- Rhodobaenus aequatorialis Hustache, 1938
- Rhodobaenus albopunctatus Champion, 1910
- Rhodobaenus alboscutellatus Chevrolat, L.A.A., 1885
- Rhodobaenus anceps Csiki, E., 1936
- Rhodobaenus andreae Chevrolat, L.A.A., 1885
- Rhodobaenus apicalis Hustache, 1936
- Rhodobaenus arcuatus Champion, 1910
- Rhodobaenus auctus Vaurie, 1981
- Rhodobaenus augustinus Günther, 1941
- Rhodobaenus auriculatus Champion, G.C., 1910
- Rhodobaenus bicinctus Chevrolat, L.A.A., 1885
- Rhodobaenus bipunctatus Chevrolat, L.A.A., 1885
- Rhodobaenus bisignatus Champion, 1910
- Rhodobaenus biundulatus Champion, 1910
- Rhodobaenus bivittatus Vaurie, 1980
- Rhodobaenus boliviensis Hustache, 1936
- Rhodobaenus brevirostris Champion, 1910
- Rhodobaenus buchanani Vaurie, 1981
- Rhodobaenus cariniventris Champion, 1910
- Rhodobaenus centromaculatus Chevrolat, L.A.A., 1885
- Rhodobaenus cinctus Champion, G.C., 1910
- Rhodobaenus cinereiventris Champion, 1910
- Rhodobaenus confusus Chevrolat, L.A.A., 1885
- Rhodobaenus cordifer Voss, 1954
- Rhodobaenus corniculatus Chevrolat, L.A.A., 1885
- Rhodobaenus crassipes Champion, 1910
- Rhodobaenus cribrarius Gyllenhal, L. in Schönherr, C.J., 1838
- Rhodobaenus crucicollis Chevrolat, L.A.A., 1885
- Rhodobaenus cuneatus Vaurie, 1967
- Rhodobaenus cuneipennis Chevrolat, L.A.A., 1882
- Rhodobaenus curvus Vaurie, 1980
- Rhodobaenus cylindricollis Champion, 1910
- Rhodobaenus deliciosus Champion, G.C., 1910
- Rhodobaenus deltoides Chevrolat, L.A.A., 1885
- Rhodobaenus dentifer Champion, 1910
- Rhodobaenus duodecimmaculatus Chevrolat, L.A.A., 1885
- Rhodobaenus elegans Chevrolat, L.A.A., 1885
- Rhodobaenus femoralis Chevrolat, L.A.A., 1885
- Rhodobaenus formosus Csiki, E., 1936
- Rhodobaenus fortirostris Champion, 1910
- Rhodobaenus funerarius Chevrolat, L.A.A., 1885
- Rhodobaenus graphicus Champion, G.C., 1910
- Rhodobaenus guttatus Champion, G.C., 1910
- Rhodobaenus haematidus Chevrolat, L.A.A., 1885
- Rhodobaenus howelli Anderson, 2002
- Rhodobaenus immaculatus Champion, G.C., 1910
- Rhodobaenus implicatus Chevrolat, L.A.A., 1885
- Rhodobaenus impressus Chevrolat, L.A.A., 1885
- Rhodobaenus inopinatus Vaurie, 1981
- Rhodobaenus interruptus Champion, 1910
- Rhodobaenus labrecheae Anderson, 2002
- Rhodobaenus latens Vaurie, 1981
- Rhodobaenus lebasi Champion, G.C., 1910
- Rhodobaenus lebasii Vaurie, 1981
- Rhodobaenus leptocerus Csiki, E., 1936
- Rhodobaenus leucographus Champion, G.C., 1910
- Rhodobaenus lineatocollis Csiki, E., 1936
- Rhodobaenus lineiger Chevrolat, L.A.A., 1885
- Rhodobaenus longicollis Hustache, 1936
- Rhodobaenus luteus Hustache, 1938
- Rhodobaenus maculatus Sturm, 1826
- Rhodobaenus maculifer Champion, G.C., 1910
- Rhodobaenus maculipes Champion, 1910
- Rhodobaenus maior Vaurie, 1967
- Rhodobaenus mas Vaurie, 1981
- Rhodobaenus melanocardius Kuschel, 1955
- Rhodobaenus melanurus Csiki, E., 1936
- Rhodobaenus melas Vaurie, 1981
- Rhodobaenus mesomelas Champion, 1910
- Rhodobaenus metropolitanus Chevrolat, L.A.A., 1885
- Rhodobaenus miniatus Chevrolat, L.A.A., 1885
- Rhodobaenus nawradi Champion, G.C., 1910
- Rhodobaenus nawradii Vaurie, 1967
- Rhodobaenus nebulosus Champion, 1910
- Rhodobaenus niger Champion, G.C., 1910
- Rhodobaenus nigricornis Chevrolat, L.A.A., 1885
- Rhodobaenus nigripennis Vaurie, 1981
- Rhodobaenus nigripes Hustache, 1936
- Rhodobaenus nigrolineatus Chevrolat, L.A.A., 1885
- Rhodobaenus nigropictus Champion, 1910
- Rhodobaenus nigrosignatus Champion, 1910
- Rhodobaenus nivosus Vaurie, 1980
- Rhodobaenus obliquus Chevrolat, L.A.A., 1885
- Rhodobaenus obscurus Csiki, E., 1936
- Rhodobaenus olivaceus Champion, 1910
- Rhodobaenus pantherinus Champion, 1910
- Rhodobaenus patriciae Anderson, 2002
- Rhodobaenus pinguis Chevrolat, L.A.A., 1885
- Rhodobaenus plicatus Champion, 1910
- Rhodobaenus pulchellus Champion, G.C., 1910
- Rhodobaenus pullus Vaurie, 1980
- Rhodobaenus punctatus Gyllenhal, L. in Schönherr, C.J., 1838
- Rhodobaenus puncticollis Chevrolat, L.A.A., 1885
- Rhodobaenus pustulatus Chevrolat, L.A.A., 1885
- Rhodobaenus pustulosus (Gyllenhal, 1838)
- Rhodobaenus quadripunctatus Champion, G.C., 1910
- Rhodobaenus quadrus Vaurie, 1980
- Rhodobaenus quatuordecimpunctatus Csiki, E., 1936
- Rhodobaenus quinquemaculatus Chevrolat, L.A.A., 1885
- Rhodobaenus quinquepunctatus (Say, 1824) (cocklebur weevil)
- Rhodobaenus quintus Vaurie, 1981
- Rhodobaenus rhinopilus Vaurie, 1980
- Rhodobaenus riparius Vaurie, 1980
- Rhodobaenus rubellus Champion, G.C., 1910
- Rhodobaenus rubicundus Champion, 1910
- Rhodobaenus rubrovittatus Champion, 1910
- Rhodobaenus saginatus Champion, 1910
- Rhodobaenus sanguineus Csiki, E., 1936
- Rhodobaenus saucius Csiki, E., 1936
- Rhodobaenus schnusei Günther, 1941
- Rhodobaenus sexguttatus Champion, 1910
- Rhodobaenus stigmaticollis Chevrolat, L.A.A., 1882
- Rhodobaenus stigmaticus Champion, G.C., 1910
- Rhodobaenus subcristatus Champion, 1910
- Rhodobaenus suturalis Chevrolat, L.A.A., 1885
- Rhodobaenus suturellus Chevrolat, L.A.A., 1885
- Rhodobaenus tenorio Anderson, 2002
- Rhodobaenus tenuiscapus Champion, 1910
- Rhodobaenus tessellatus Champion, 1910
- Rhodobaenus thoracicus Vaurie, 1981
- Rhodobaenus tredecimpunctatus (Illiger, 1794) (ironweed curculio)
- Rhodobaenus triangularis Champion, G.C., 1910
- Rhodobaenus unidentatus Champion, 1910
- Rhodobaenus valens Champion, 1910
- Rhodobaenus variabilis Csiki, E., 1936
- Rhodobaenus varieguttatus Chevrolat, L.A.A., 1885
- Rhodobaenus veraepacis Champion, 1910
- Rhodobaenus vittatipennis Champion, G.C., 1910
- Rhodobaenus v-nigrum Champion, 1910
- Rhodobaenus ypsilon Chevrolat, L.A.A., 1885
