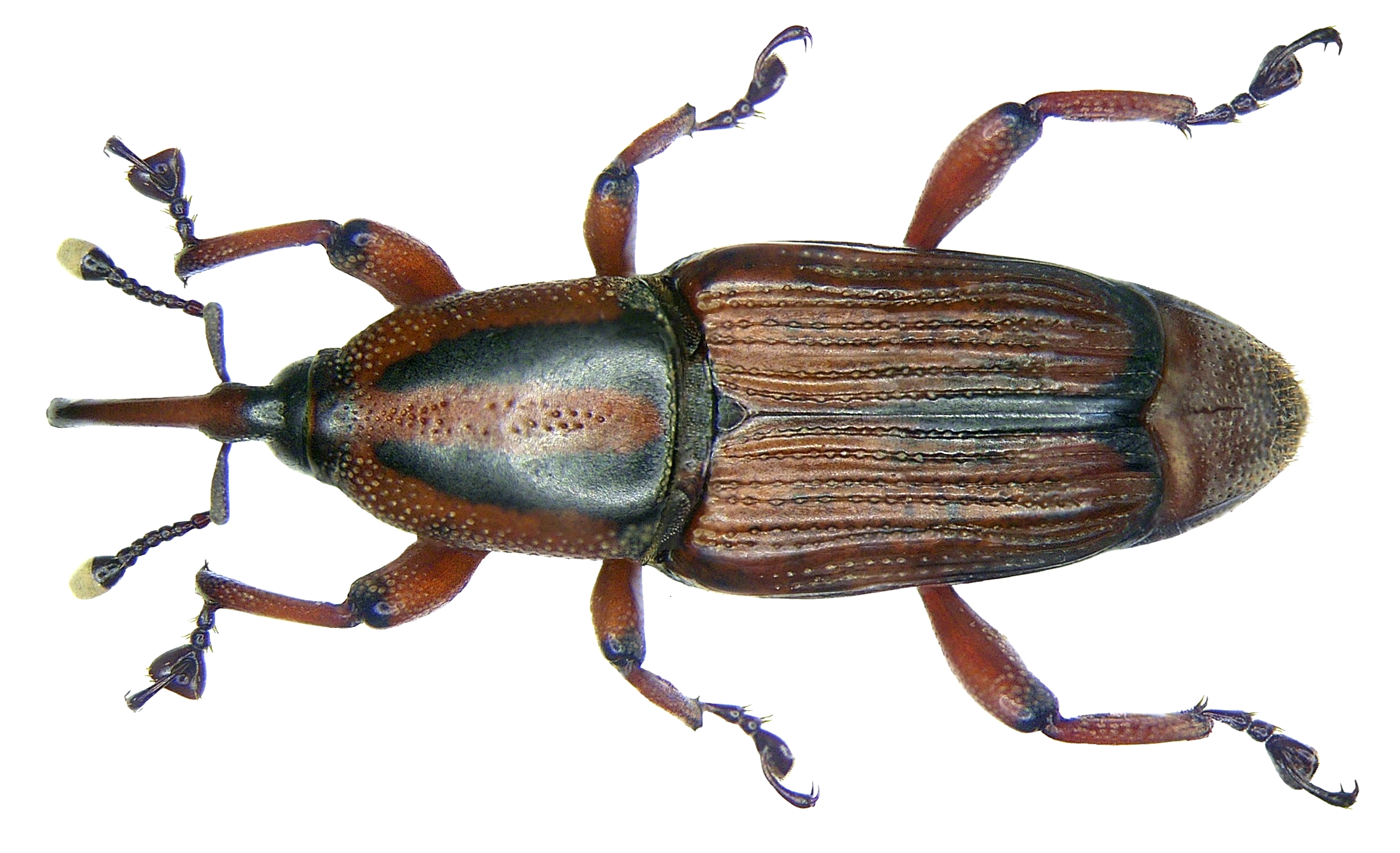

Scientific classification
- Kingdom: Animalia
- Phylum: Arthropoda
- Class: Insecta
- Order: Coleoptera
- Suborder: Polyphaga
- Infraorder: Cucujiformia
- Family: Curculionidae
- Genus: Odoiporus
- Species: O. longicollis

Binomial name
- Odoiporus longicollis G.A.K. Marshall, 1930

Synonyms
- Calandra longicollis Olivier, 1807; Sphenophorus planipennis Gyllenhal; Rhynchophorus gages (J.C.Fabricius, 1792)

= Odoiporus longicollis =

Species of beetle

Odoiporus longicollis, commonly known as banana stem weevil, pseudostem weevil, or banana pseudostem borer, is a species of weevil found in South Asia and South East Asia.

== Distribution ==
It is widely distributed throughout Bhutan, Cambodia, China, Hong Kong, India, Andaman and Nicobar Islands, Indonesia, Japan, Laos, Malaysia, Myanmar, Nepal, Pakistan, Philippines, Singapore, Sri Lanka, Taiwan, Thailand and Vietnam.

== Biology ==
This species has a body length of about 23 to 39 mm. Adults are black, but some reddish individuals also observed. This color variation is due to a phenomenon of non-sex limited variation and of sympatry. First instar larvae fleshy, yellowish white with dark brown head and apodous. Pupa is exarate and pale yellow in color.

Usually a nocturnal monophagous species of weevil, they have seen to fly during daytime only with rain or on cloudy days. The pre-oviposition period is about 15 to 30 days and the adults mate throughout the day and night. After a single mating, an adult female lays about nine eggs at the rate of one egg per day. Eggs laid by gravid females are yellowish-white in color and elliptical-shaped. Eggs are laid in the outer epidermal layer of the leaf sheath of the pseudostem down to the air chambers. Eggs that are 3.14 mm in length, are usually cream in color and cylindrical with rounded ends. The incubation period ranges from 3 to 8 days.

The first instar feeds on tissues of the succulent sheath by tunneling extensively with a depth of about 8 to 10 cm. After heavy feeding continued through five instar larva, it enters the non-feeding prepupal stage. Then it constructs a cocoon by winding short pieces of fibrous materials of the sheath around the body. Duration from egg to adult stage in captivity is 44 days. The average lifespan of the species is about one year.

== Attack ==
It is one of the major pests of bananas and plantains that attacks leaves and stems. Adults are attracted to the plant through the volatiles released by the banana. Infestation starts with 5-month-old plants. An early symptom is appearing small pinhead-sized holes on the stem and fibrous extrusions from the bases of leaf petioles. In secondary infestation, rotting can occur due to pathogens and a foul odor is emitted. There is a dehydrated condition with premature ripening of the bunch.

Larvae generally bore through the pseudostems and bunch stalks where the leaves become yellowish and susceptible to wind damage. These boring tunnels rapidly become discolored and finally plant dies when larva attacks the central growing point. When the first instar emerges during the advanced pre-flowering stage, ascending flower bud and the peduncle inside the pseudostem can be eaten and damaged resulting in non-emergence of the flower bud. The tunnels made by larva can extend towards the fruit peduncle or to the lowermost collar region near the rhizome. Just before completion of the cocoon, the larva starts to cut a characteristic rectangular hole in leaves, evidence of the pest.

== Control ==
The most common controlling method is clean culture, accompanied by trapping the adults. Therefore, dry leaves and leaf sheaths as well as broken and decaying plants and pseudostems should remove quickly or burn. Release of sterile males irradiated with X-rays and gamma-rays is also a possible method. Apart from that, pest-resistant banana varieties such as "Bhimkal", "Athiakol", "Elavazhai" and "Sawai" can be planted. Infested pseudostems can be fumigated as well as apply aluminium phosphide tablets called Celphos are also effective.

Under chemical control, a systemic organophosphorus compound such as monocrotophos can be injected into the stem. Apart from that, other pesticides such as swabbing along with surfactants, swabbing with mud slurry containing the candidate insecticide also used. The natural predators of the beetle include Chrysopilus ferruginosus and Plaesius javanus. Also, several organisms such as; an ectoparasitic mite, Uropodia, and an entomopathogenic fungus Metarhizium anisopliae also used effectively. Natural pathogens of the larva and adult include: Fusarium solani, Beauveria bassiana, Mucor hiemalis, Aspergillus niger and Scopulariopsis brevicaulis.

== Gallery ==
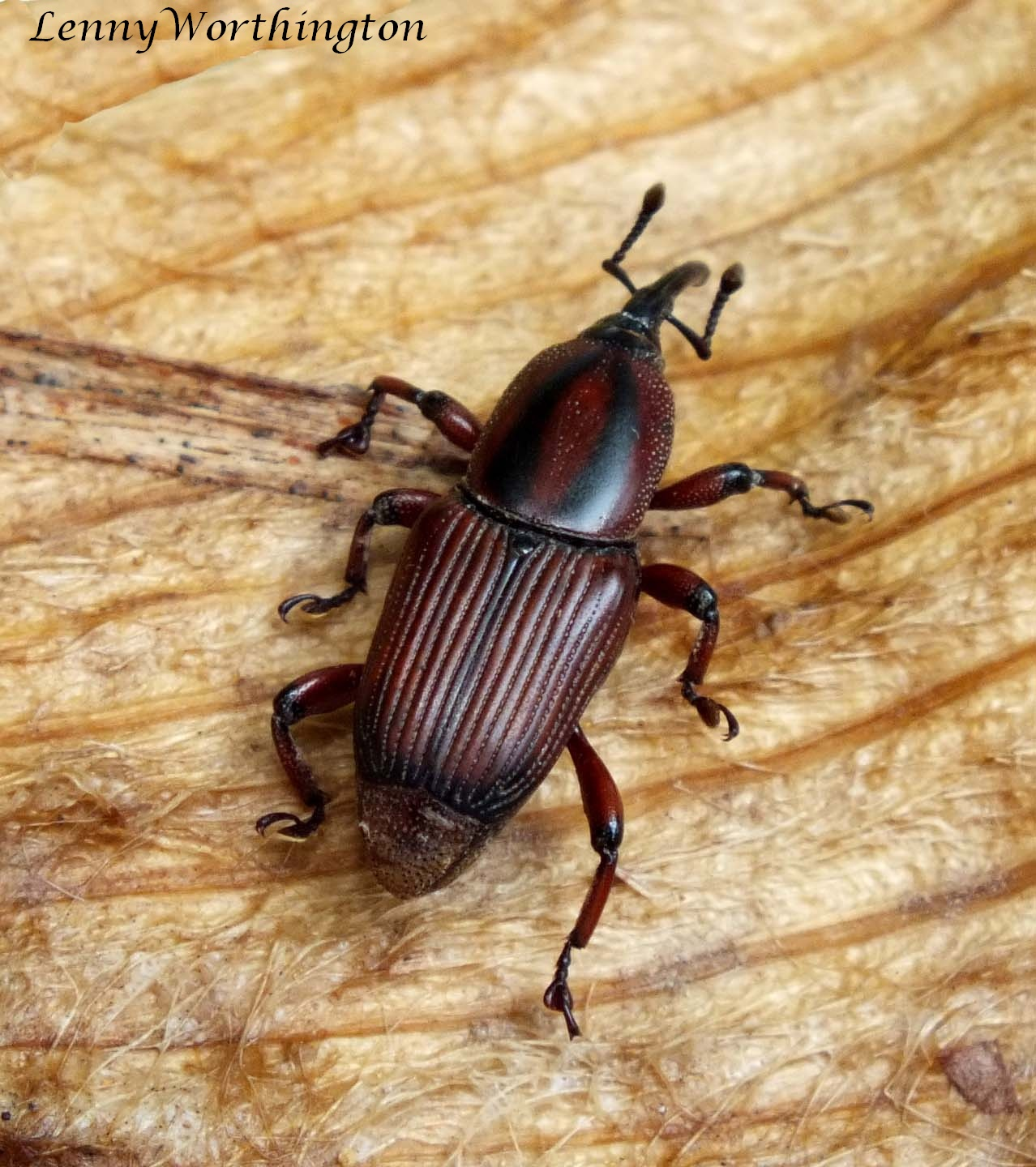
in Thailand

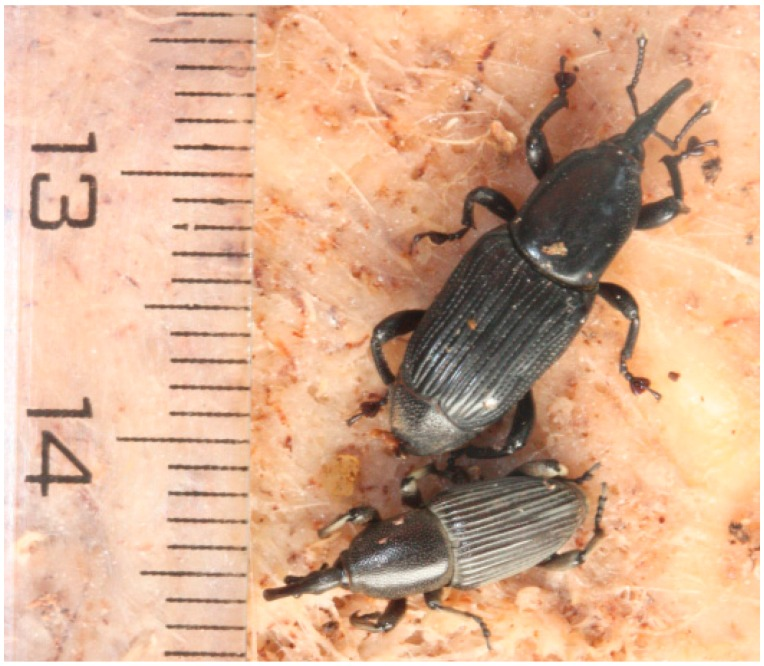

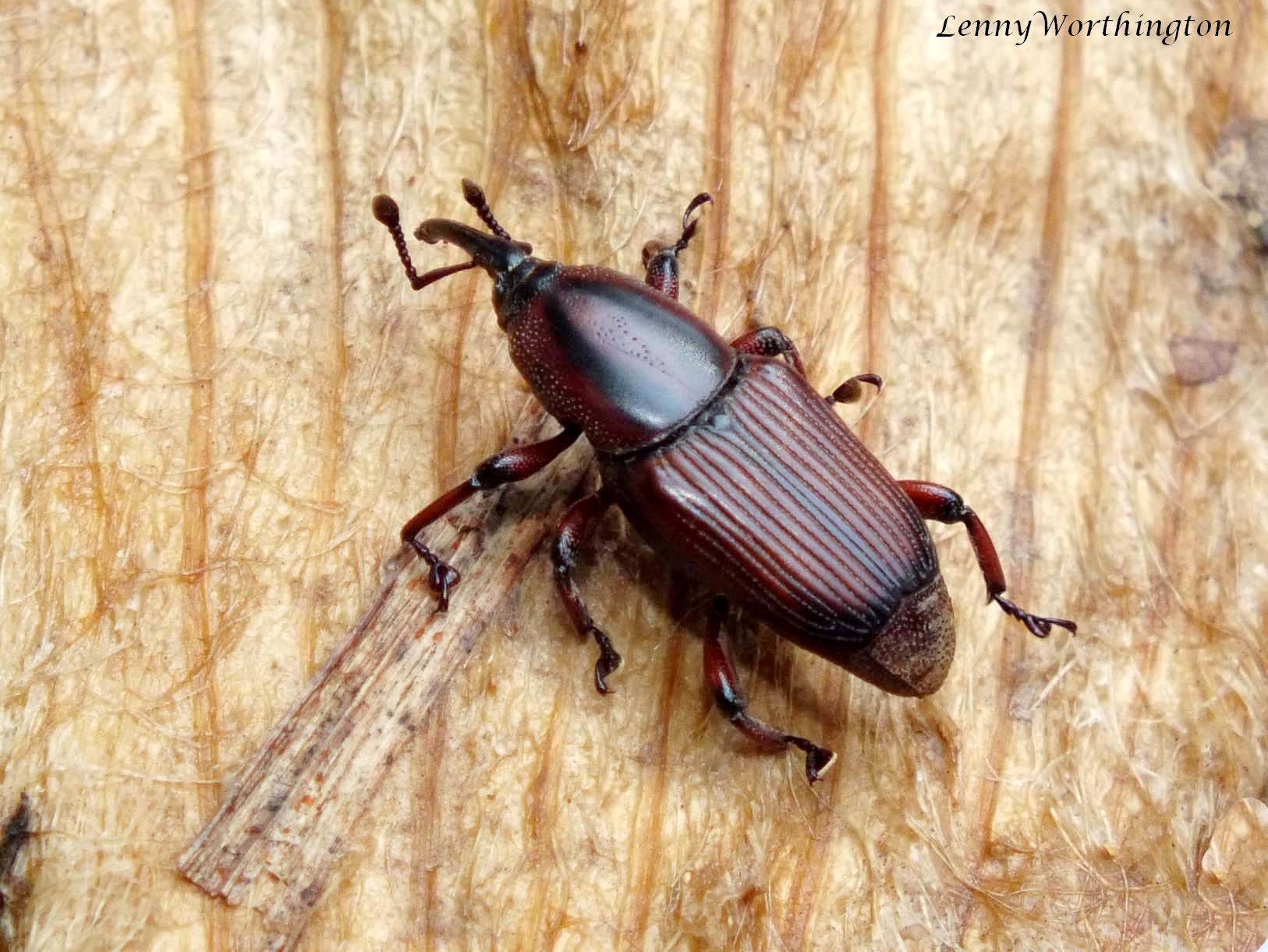

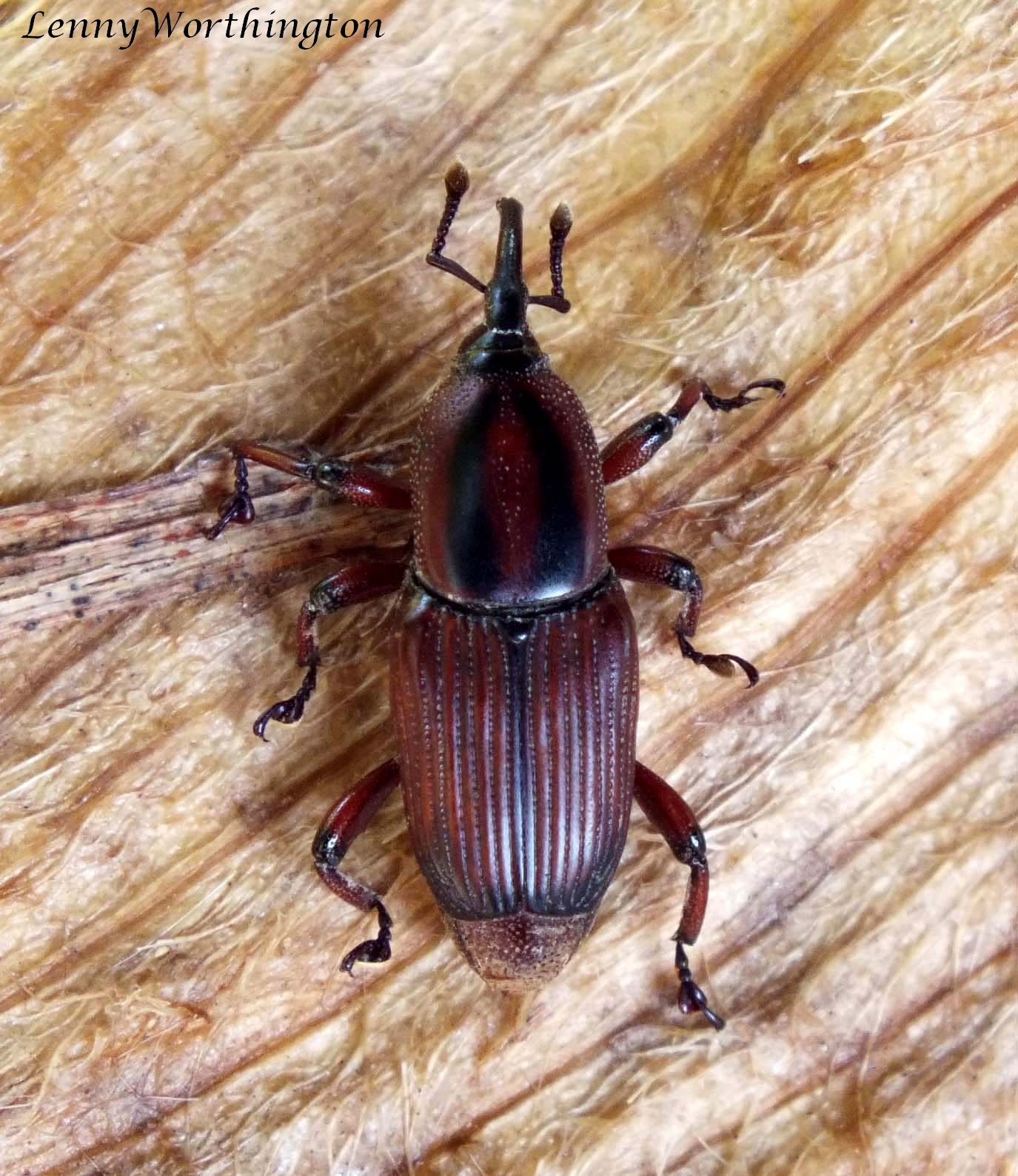
