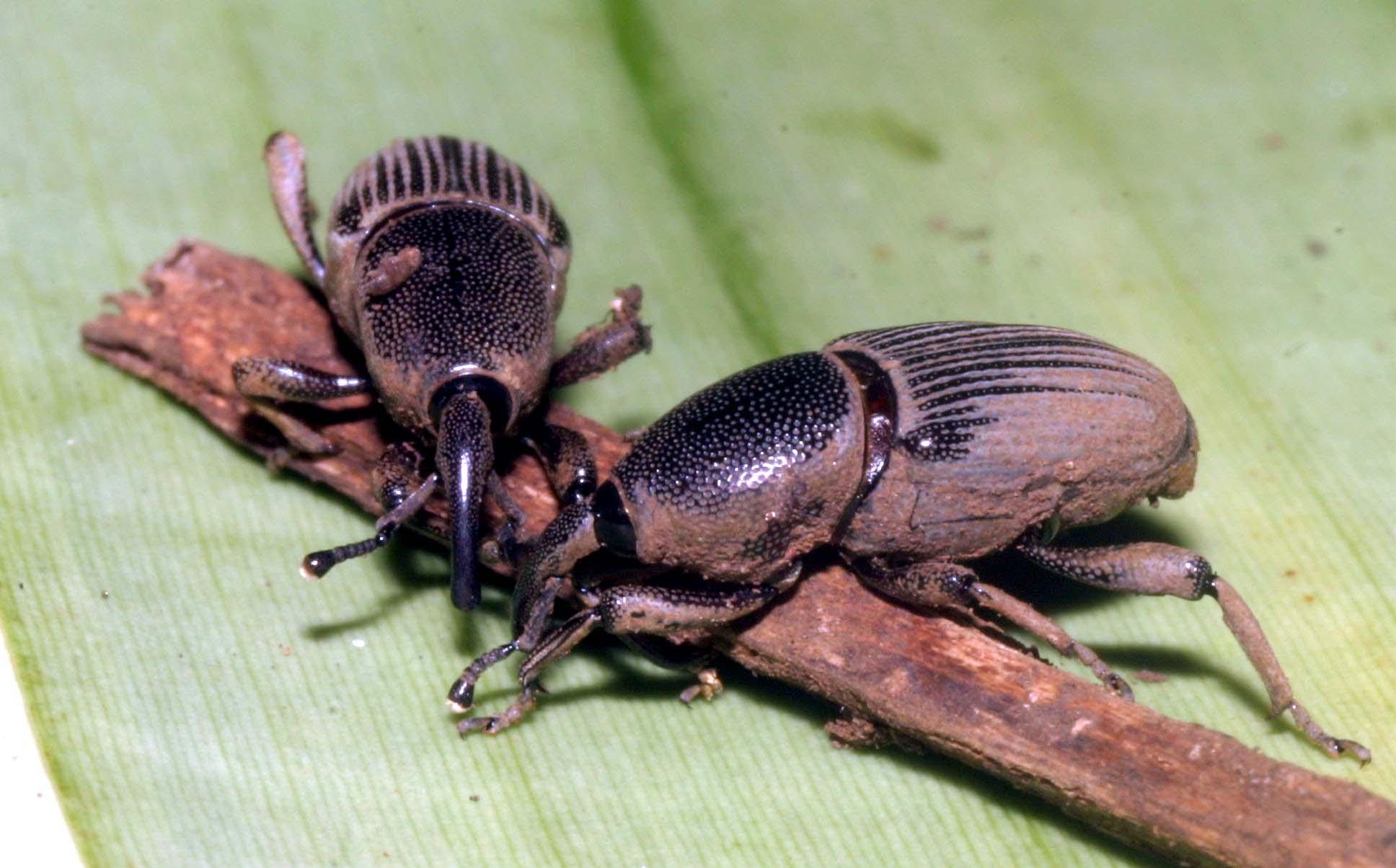

Scientific classification
- Domain: Eukaryota
- Kingdom: Animalia
- Phylum: Arthropoda
- Class: Insecta
- Order: Coleoptera
- Suborder: Polyphaga
- Infraorder: Cucujiformia
- Family: Curculionidae
- Subfamily: Dryophthorinae
- Tribe: Sphenophorini
- Genus: Cosmopolites
- Species: C. sordidus

Binomial name
- Cosmopolites sordidus (Germar, 1824)

Synonyms
- Calandra sordida Germar, 1824

= Cosmopolites sordidus =

Species of beetle

Cosmopolites sordidus, commonly known as the banana root borer, banana borer, or banana weevil, is a species of weevil in the family Curculionidae. It is a pest of banana cultivation and has a cosmopolitan distribution, being found in all parts of the world in which bananas are grown. It is considered the most serious insect pest of bananas.

== Description ==
The adult banana root borer is about 11 mm (3/8 in) in length and has a glossy greyish-black or dark brown appearance. Unlike the billbugs (Sphenophorus), the thorax lacks depressions. The tibia of each of the limbs bears an accessory hook-like claw with which the insect clings to plants. The larva is plump and whitish with a reddish-brown head. The eighth abdominal segment of the larva bears a large spiracle, the remaining segments bearing small spiracles; the last two segments appear truncated, being fused together to form a plate-like structure. The pupa has an irregular appearance, with the developing wings and limbs being discernable through the pupal case.

== Distribution ==
The banana root borer probably originated in southeastern Asia and Indonesia. It now has a cosmopolitan distribution and is found in all the banana-growing regions of the world: southern Asia, Africa, Macaronesia, Australia, South and Central America, the West Indies and Mexico. In the United States it is restricted to Monroe and Miami-Dade Counties in Florida. It is easily transported from one place to another in the larval stage, inside sections of root or corm.

== Ecology ==
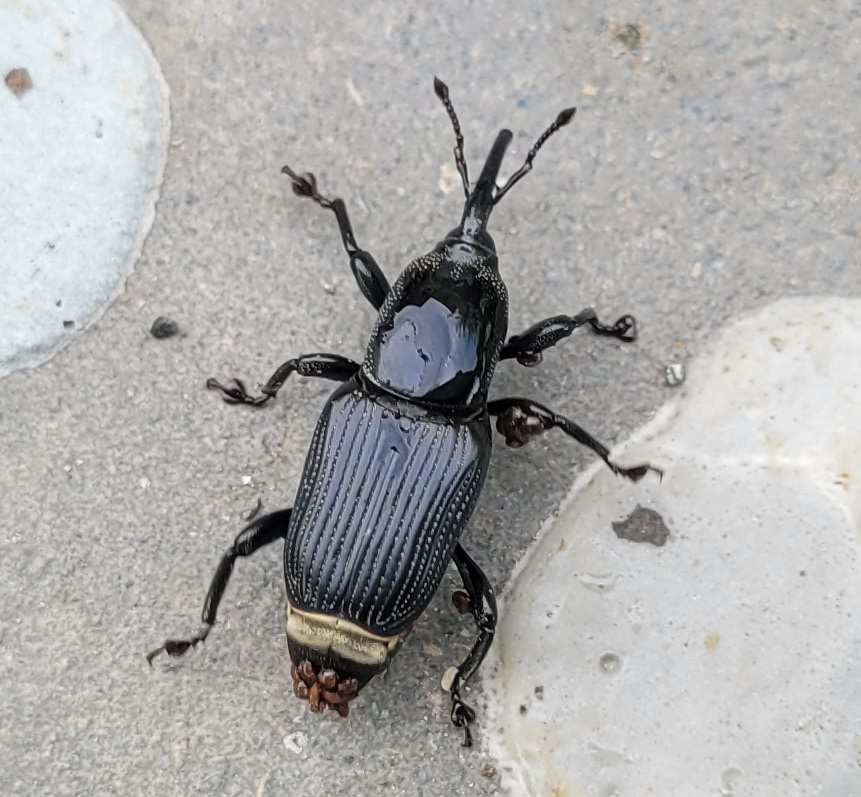
Banana weevil with phoretic mites from Mindanao, Philippines

Banana root borers feed on any species of Musa (banana), but they show a preference for plantains and East African Highland bananas (matoke) over dessert and brewing bananas. They are attracted to the host plants by the volatile chemicals given off, especially from damaged corms. They have been reported as feeding on Manila hemp, sugarcane and yams, but they probably only do this when they are unable to access banana plants.

The adult female deposits her eggs singly between the leaf sheath and the stem, or at the base of the stem in the vicinity of the corm. On hatching about six days later, the larvae burrow into the stem or the root, and it is their burrowing activities that weaken the plant and make it liable to be blown over. The complete life cycle takes 30 to 40 days, including a larval stage of 15 to 20 days. In southeastern Asia, the banana root borer is preyed on by the beetle Plaesius javanus, which feeds on the eggs, all the larval stages, the pupae and the adults. This beetle has been introduced to other parts of the root borer's range to attempt biological pest control.

== Damage ==
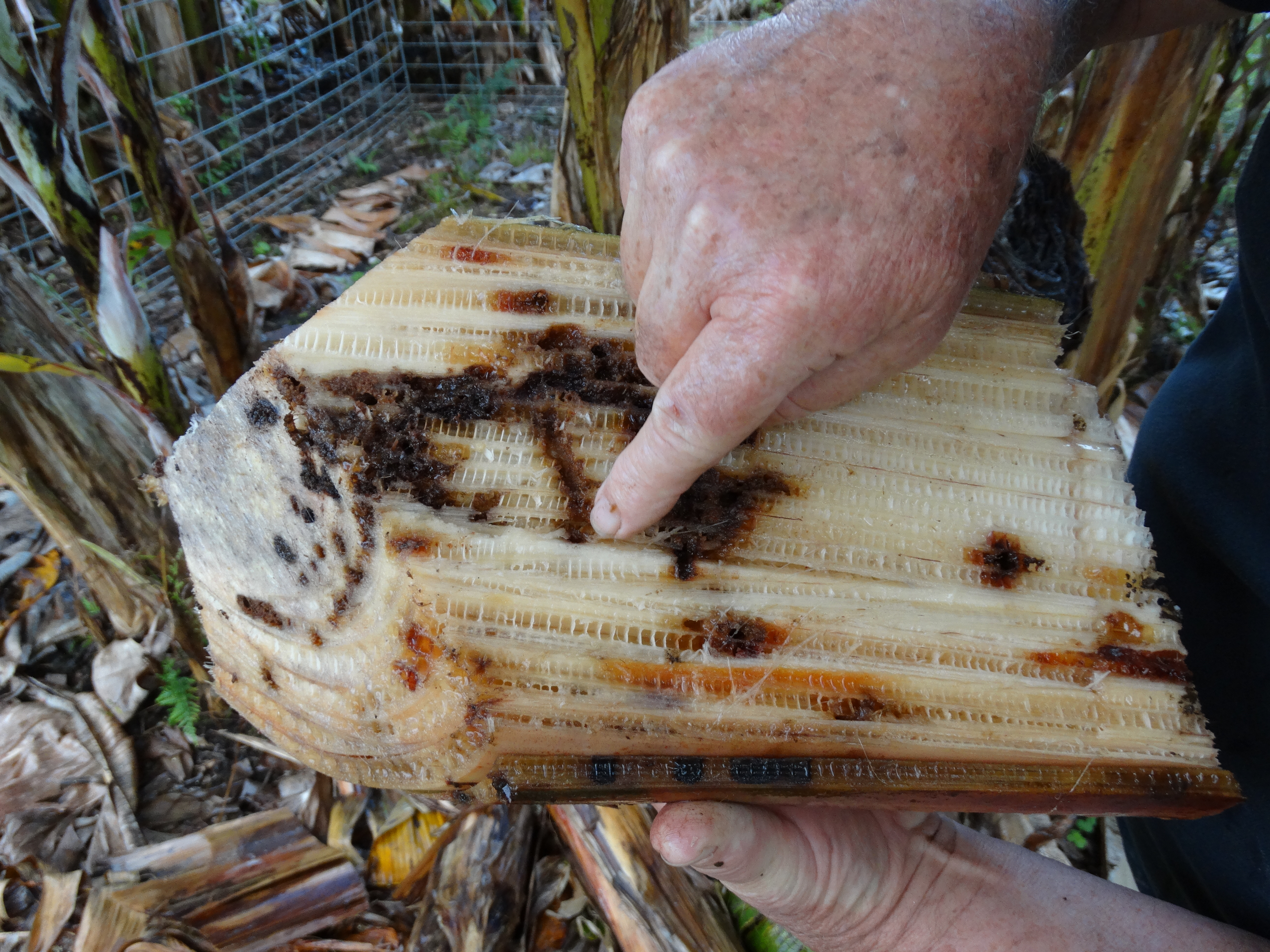
Banana weevil damage on a banana stem

The tunneling activities of the root borer weaken the stem, make the plant more susceptible to lodging, cause reduced uptake of nutrients, and result in crop damage and lower yields. Newly planted stands fail to thrive, and the damage increases over time. The adults are nocturnal, are poor fliers, and have low fecundity; their dispersal is limited. Planting insect-free roots or tissue culture plantlets may be effective for a few years before insects move in from surrounding areas. The removal and destruction of crop residues is another means of reducing damage from this pest and increasing yields. Another possible control method is attracting the adults with pheromones and trapping them.
