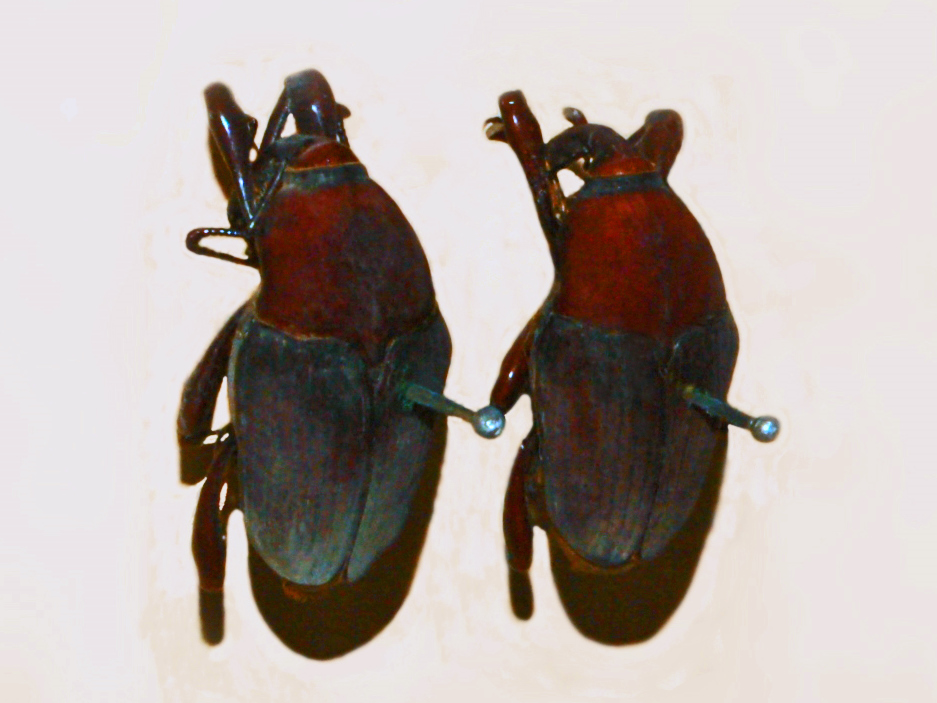
- Barystethus tropicus from New Guinea

Scientific classification
- Kingdom: Animalia
- Phylum: Arthropoda
- Class: Insecta
- Order: Coleoptera
- Suborder: Polyphaga
- Infraorder: Cucujiformia
- Family: Curculionidae
- Genus: Barystethus
- Species: B. tropicus

Binomial name
- Barystethus tropicus Pascoe, F.P., 1885

= Barystethus tropicus =

Species of beetle

Barystethus tropicus is a species of true weevil, family Curculionidae. However, Setliff (2007) lists it as a synonym of Barystethus dispar.

== Description ==
Barystethus tropicus reaches about 18 millimetres (0.71 in) in length. This species is usually black but it is quite variable in coloration. The body is elliptic, the legs and the rostrum are smooth and glossy, elytra are striated and rostrum is slightly arched.

== Distribution ==
This species occurs in Papua New Guinea.
