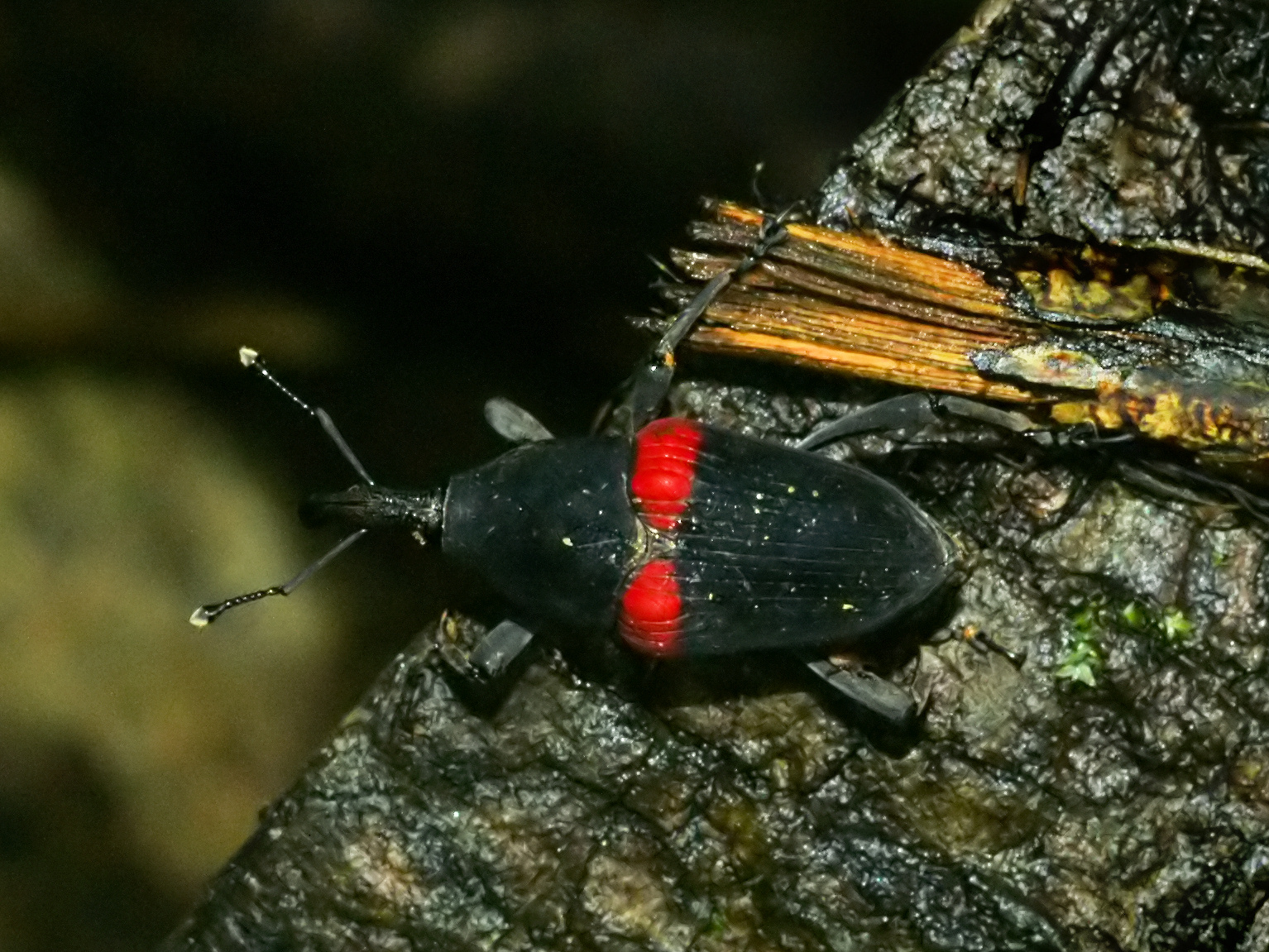
- Cactophagus sanguinolentus, Costa Rica

Scientific classification
- Kingdom: Animalia
- Phylum: Arthropoda
- Class: Insecta
- Order: Coleoptera
- Suborder: Polyphaga
- Infraorder: Cucujiformia
- Family: Curculionidae
- Subfamily: Dryophthorinae
- Tribe: Rhynchophorini
- Subtribe: Sphenophorina
- Genus: Cactophagus; LeConte, 1876

= Cactophagus =

Genus of beetles

Cactophagus is a genus of snout and bark beetles in the family Dryophthoridae found in Central America, southern North America, and northern South America. There are more than 50 described species in Cactophagus.

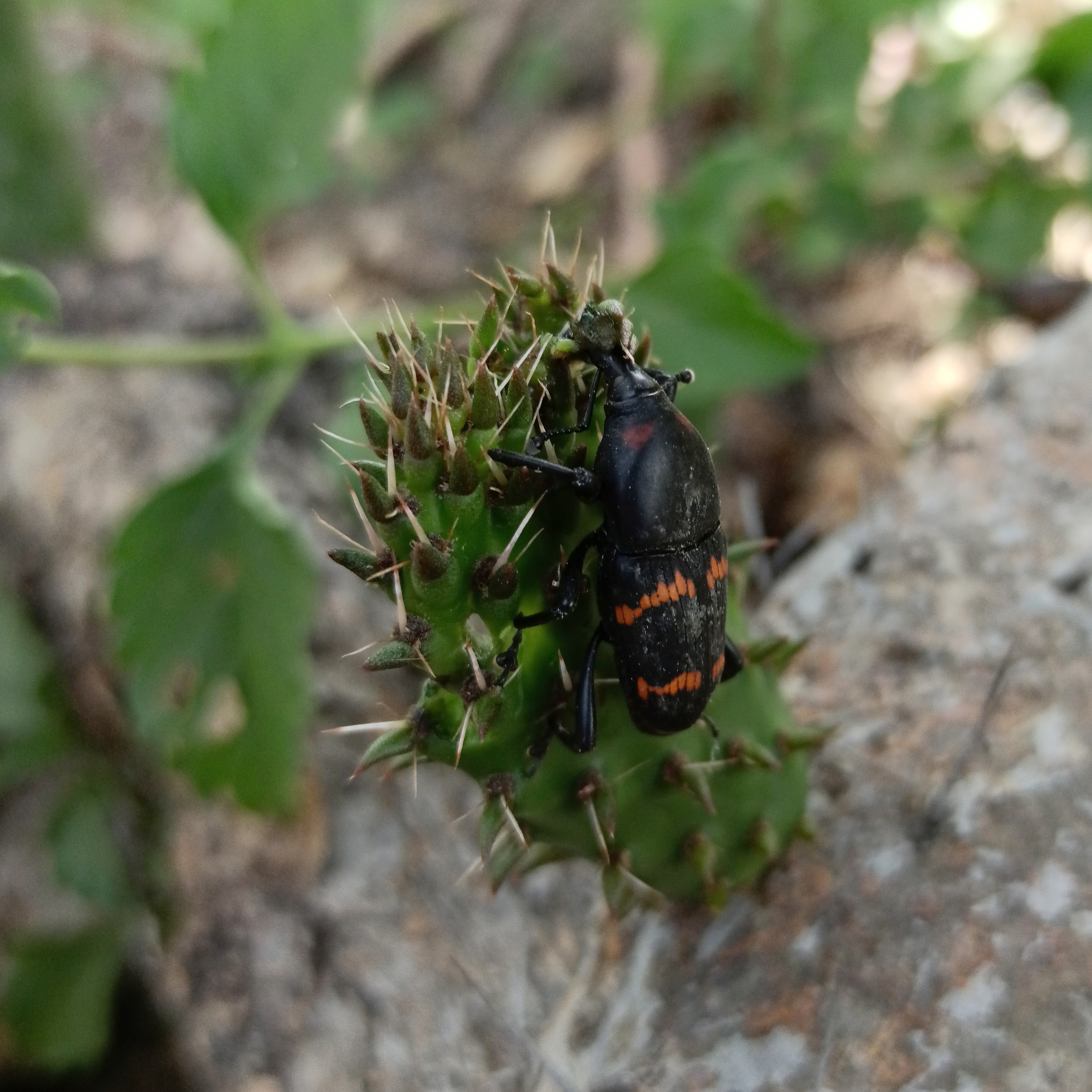
Cactophagus spinolae, Cactus weevil, Mexico

== Species ==
These 56 species belong to the genus Cactophagus:

- Cactophagus amoenus
- Cactophagus annulatus
- Cactophagus aurantiacus Hustache, 1936
- Cactophagus auriculatus Chevrolat & L.A.A., 1882
- Cactophagus aurocinctus
- Cactophagus bifasciatus E.Csiki, 1936
- Cactophagus bolivari
- Cactophagus carinipyga
- Cactophagus ciliatus Champion, 1910
- Cactophagus circumdatus
- Cactophagus circumjectus
- Cactophagus cirratus Champion, 1910
- Cactophagus consularis Hustache, 1936
- Cactophagus dragoni Anderson, 2002
- Cactophagus duplocinctus
- Cactophagus fahraei
- Cactophagus foveolatus Günther, 1941
- Cactophagus gasbarrinorum Anderson, 2002
- Cactophagus hustachei Günther, 1941
- Cactophagus impressipectus Voss, 1953
- Cactophagus lineatus Anderson, 2002
- Cactophagus lingorum Anderson, 2002
- Cactophagus major Fåhraeus & O.I., 1845
- Cactophagus mesomelas
- Cactophagus metamasioides Günther, 1941
- Cactophagus miniatopunctatus Chevrolat & L.A.A., 1882
- Cactophagus morrisi Anderson, 2002
- Cactophagus nawradi Chevrolat & L.A.A., 1882
- Cactophagus obliquefasciatus Chevrolat & L.A.A., 1882
- Cactophagus ornatus
- Cactophagus perforatus E.Csiki, 1936
- Cactophagus procerus E.Csiki, 1936
- Cactophagus pruinosus
- Cactophagus pulcherrimus Champion & G.C., 1910
- Cactophagus quadripunctatus Chevrolat & L.A.A., 1882
- Cactophagus rectistriatus
- Cactophagus riesenorum Anderson, 2002
- Cactophagus rubricatus Hustache, 1936
- Cactophagus rubroniger Fisher, 1926
- Cactophagus rubronigrum Fisher, 1926
- Cactophagus rubrovariegatus Bovie, 1907
- Cactophagus rufocinctus Champion, 1910
- Cactophagus rufomaculatus Champion, 1910
- Cactophagus sanguinipes Hustache, 1936
- Cactophagus sanguinolentus (Olivier & A.G., 1791)
- Cactophagus sierrakowskyi Champion & G.C., 1910
- Cactophagus silron Anderson, 2002
- Cactophagus sinuatus
- Cactophagus spinolae Champion, G.C., 1910
- Cactophagus sriatoforatus Champion & G.C., 1910
- Cactophagus subnitens Casey & T.L., 1892
- Cactophagus sunatoriorum Anderson, 2002
- Cactophagus tibialis Waterhouse & O.C., 1879
- Cactophagus validirostris Champion & G.C., 1910
- Cactophagus validus Champion & G.C., 1910
- Cactophagus venezolensis Günther, 1941
