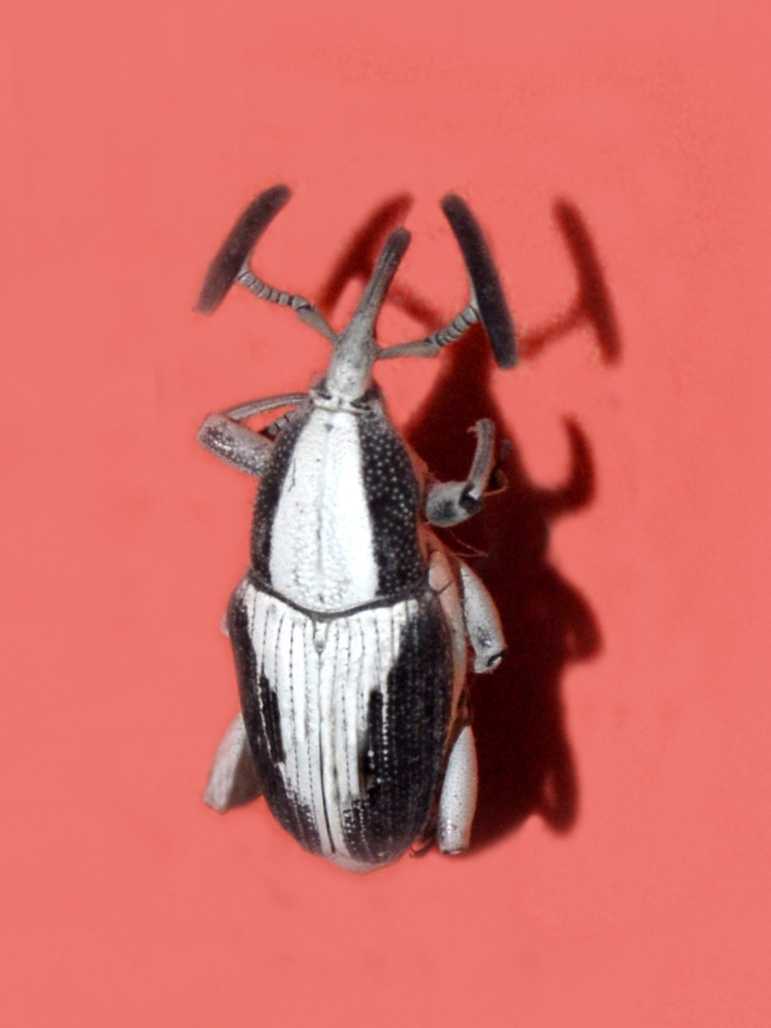
- Museum specimen of Cercidocerus securifer

Scientific classification
- Kingdom: Animalia
- Phylum: Arthropoda
- Class: Insecta
- Order: Coleoptera
- Suborder: Polyphaga
- Infraorder: Cucujiformia
- Family: Curculionidae
- Genus: Cercidocerus
- Species: C. securifer

Binomial name
- Cercidocerus securifer Kraatz, G., 1893

= Cercidocerus securifer =

Species of beetle

Cercidocerus securifer is a species of the family Curculionidae.
