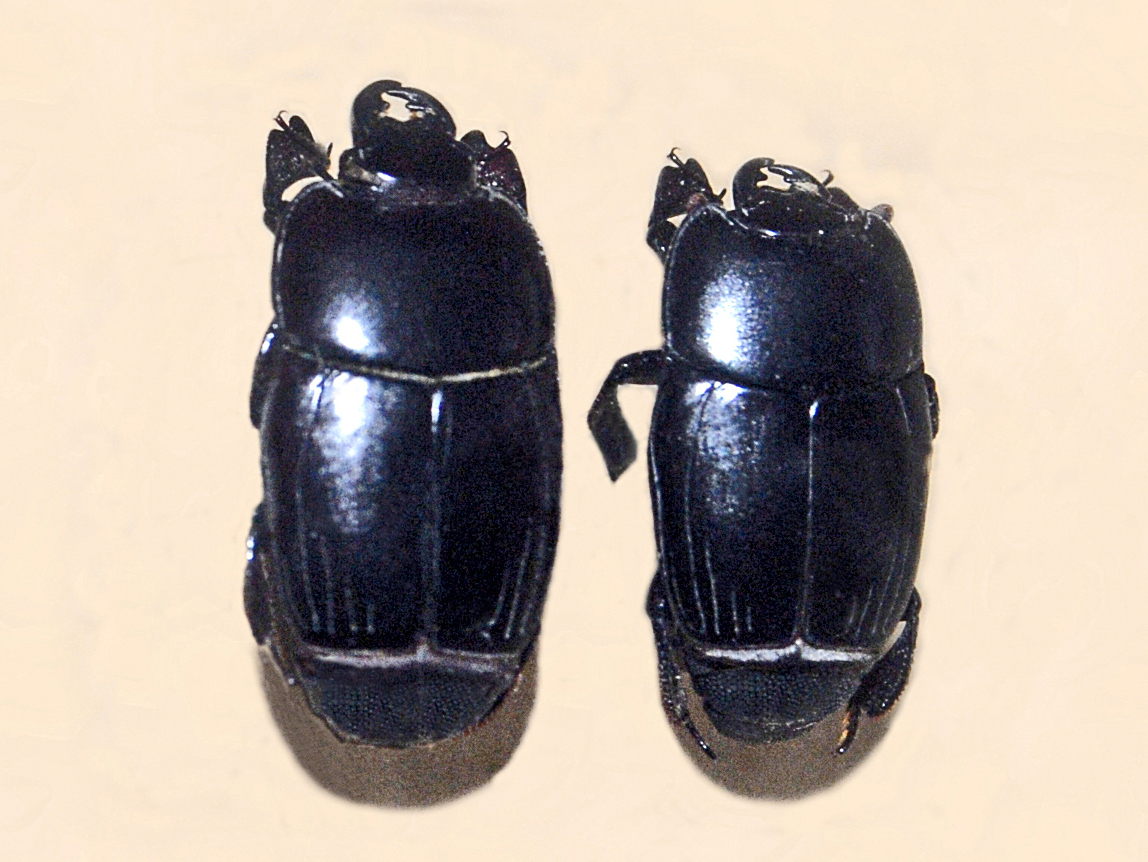
- Plaesius javanus

Scientific classification
- Domain: Eukaryota
- Kingdom: Animalia
- Phylum: Arthropoda
- Class: Insecta
- Order: Coleoptera
- Suborder: Polyphaga
- Infraorder: Staphyliniformia
- Family: Histeridae
- Subfamily: Histerinae
- Genus: Plaesius; Erichson, 1834

= Plaesius =

Genus of beetles

Plaesius is a genus of clown beetles belonging to the family Histeridae.

== Species ==
- Plaesius acutidens
- Plaesius asperimargo
- Plaesius bengalensis
- Plaesius bisinuatus
- Plaesius edentulus
- Plaesius ellipticus
- Plaesius hamatus
- Plaesius javanus
- Plaesius laevigatus
- Plaesius laevis
- Plaesius mohouti
- Plaesius planulus
- Plaesius pudicus
- Plaesius ruptistrius
- Plaesius striatipectus
