= Cyrtotrachelus elegans =

Scientific classification
- Kingdom: Animalia
- Phylum: Arthropoda
- Class: Insecta
- Order: Coleoptera
- Suborder: Polyphaga
- Infraorder: Cucujiformia
- Family: Curculionidae
- Genus: Cyrtotrachelus
- Species: C. elegans

Binomial name
- Cyrtotrachelus elegans Fairmaire, 1878

Species of beetle

Cyrtotrachelus elegans is a beetle species belonging to the genus Cyrtotrachelus. It is found in the Philippines.
