= Sphenophorina =

Sphenophorina may refer to two different taxa:

- Sphenophorina Lacordaire, 1865, a subtribe of weevils in the tribe Rhynchophorini
- Sphenophorina Breitfuss, 1898, a synonym for Grantia, a genus of calcareous sponges
