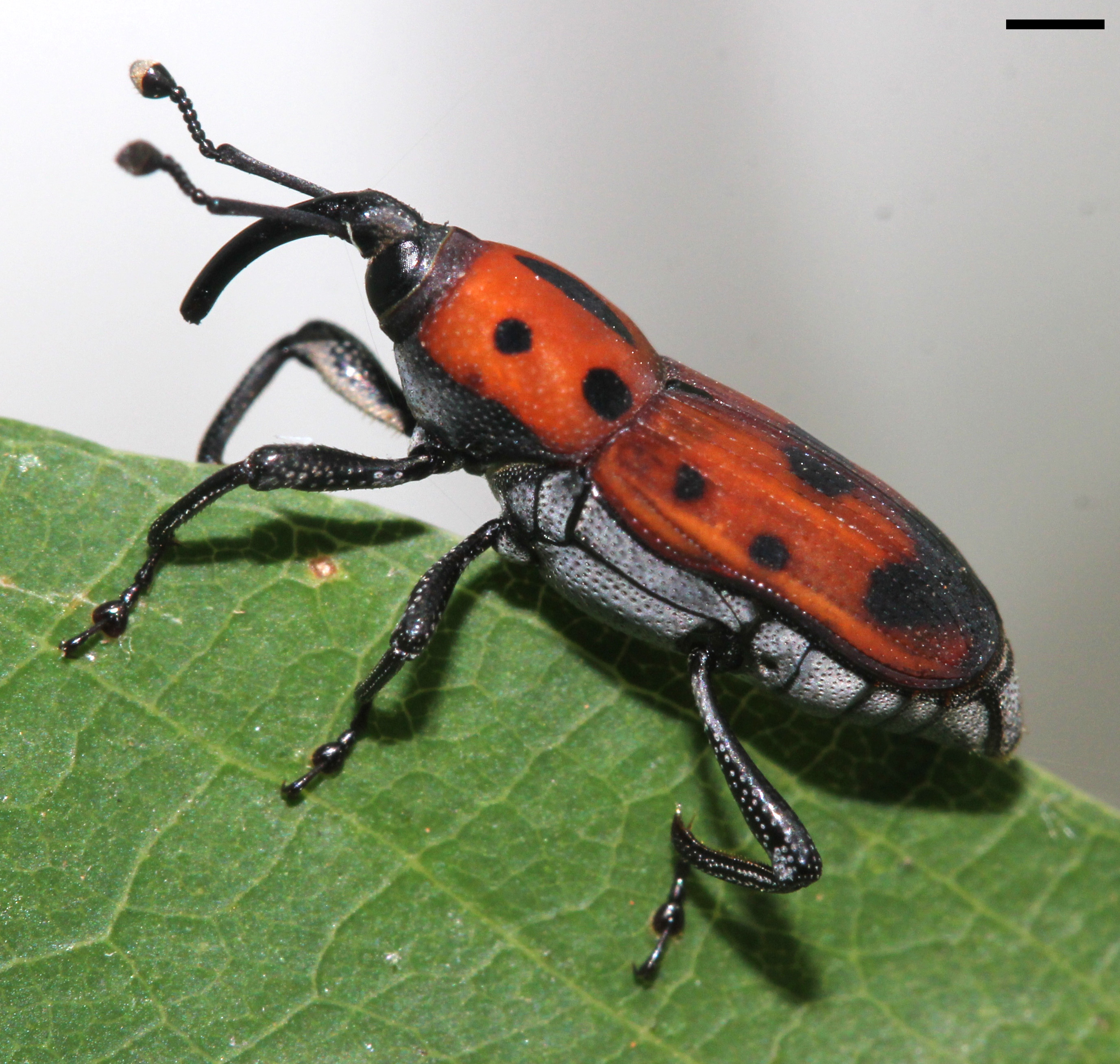
- Female Cocklebur Weevil

Scientific classification
- Kingdom: Animalia
- Phylum: Arthropoda
- Clade: Pancrustacea
- Class: Insecta
- Order: Coleoptera
- Suborder: Polyphaga
- Infraorder: Cucujiformia
- Superfamily: Curculionoidea
- Family: Curculionidae
- Genus: Rhodobaenus
- Species: R. quinquepunctatus

Binomial name
- Rhodobaenus quinquepunctatus (Say, 1824)

Synonyms
- Rhodobaenus formosus Csiki, 1936; Rhodobaenus triangularis Champion, 1910

= Rhodobaenus quinquepunctatus =

Species of beetle

Rhodobaenus quinquepunctatus, the cocklebur weevil, is a species of snout or bark beetle in the family Curculionidae. It is found in North America, and feeds primarily on plants belonging to family Asteraceae.
