= Rhodobaenus pustulosus =

Scientific classification
- Kingdom: Animalia
- Phylum: Arthropoda
- Class: Insecta
- Order: Coleoptera
- Suborder: Polyphaga
- Infraorder: Cucujiformia
- Family: Curculionidae
- Genus: Rhodobaenus
- Species: R. pustulosus

Binomial name
- Rhodobaenus pustulosus (Gyllenhal, 1838)

Synonyms
- Rhodobaenus alboscutellatus Chevrolat, 1885; Rhodobaenus puncticollis Chevrolat, 1885; Sphenophorus punctatus Gyllenhal, 1838

Species of beetle

Rhodobaenus pustulosus is a species of beetle in the family Dryophthoridae. It is found in Central America and North America.
