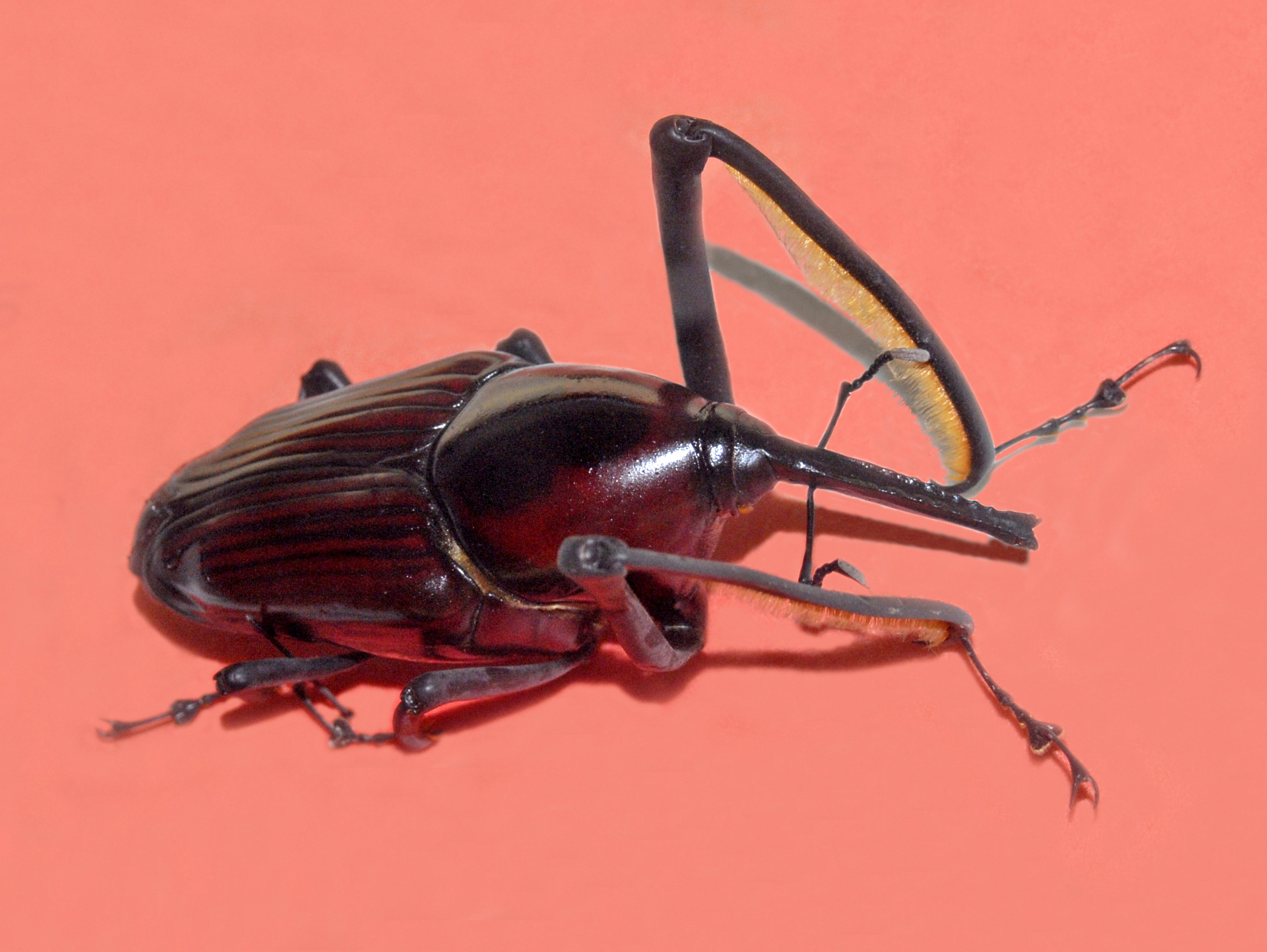
- Museum specimen of Cyrtotrachelus dux

Scientific classification
- Kingdom: Animalia
- Phylum: Arthropoda
- Class: Insecta
- Order: Coleoptera
- Suborder: Polyphaga
- Infraorder: Cucujiformia
- Family: Curculionidae
- Subfamily: Dryophthorinae
- Tribe: Rhynchophorini
- Genus: Cyrtotrachelus; Schönherr, 1838

= Cyrtotrachelus =

Genus of beetles

Cyrtotrachelus is a genus of beetles belonging to the family Curculionidae.

== Species ==
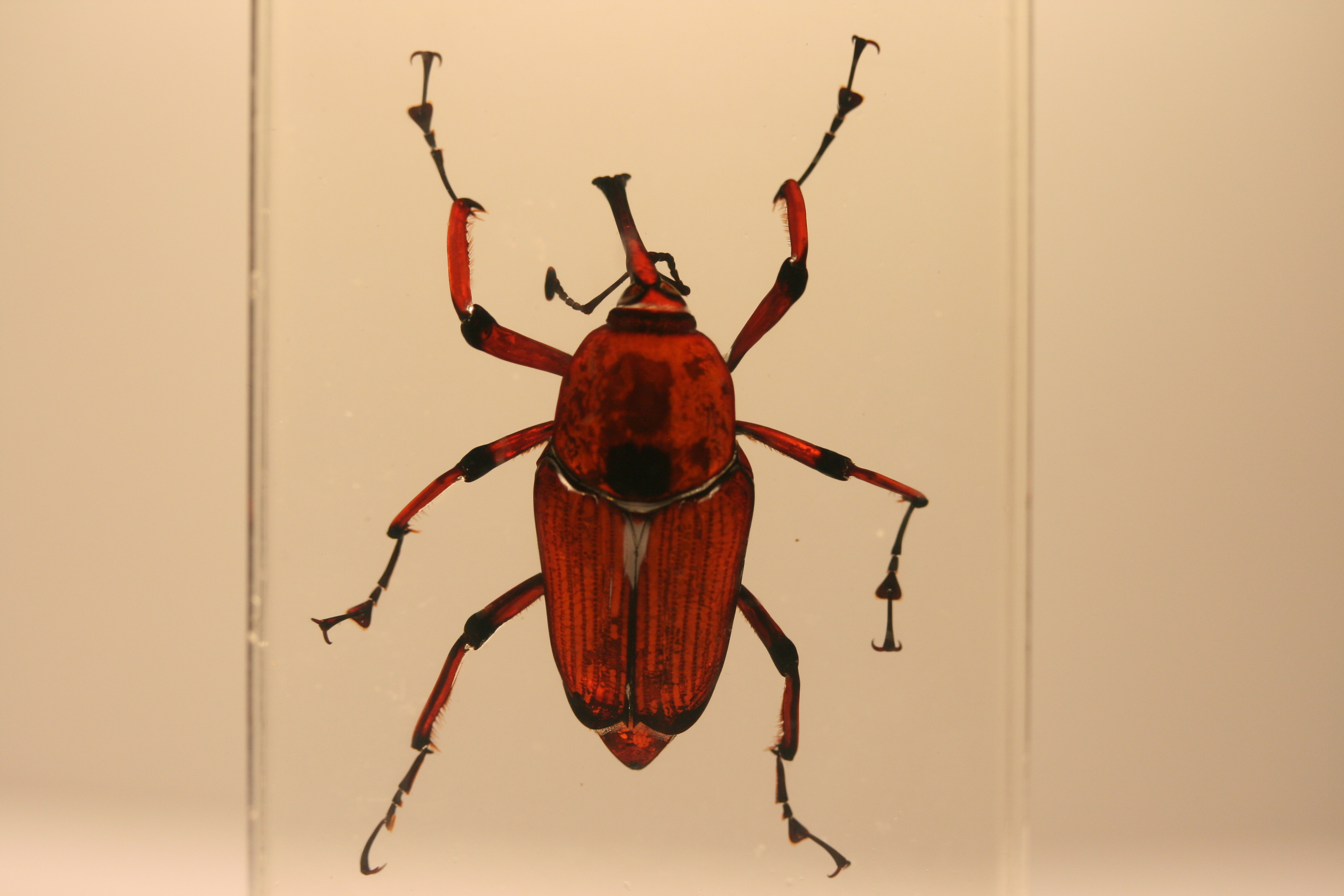
Compound of a Cyrtotrachelus in acryl

- Cyrtotrachelus areolatus Fairmaire, 1899
- Cyrtotrachelus bipartitus Hartmann, 1899
- Cyrtotrachelus birmanicus Faust, 1895
- Cyrtotrachelus bispinus Chevrolat, 1882
- Cyrtotrachelus borealis Jordan, 1894
- Cyrtotrachelus buqueti Guérin-Méneville, 1844
- Cyrtotrachelus davidis Fairmaire, 1878
- Cyrtotrachelus dichrous Fairmaire, 1878
- Cyrtotrachelus dorsalis Heller, 1923
- Cyrtotrachelus dux Boheman in Schönherr, 1845
- Cyrtotrachelus elegans Fairmaire, 1878
- Cyrtotrachelus feae Faust, 1895
- Cyrtotrachelus himalayanus Heller, 1923
- Cyrtotrachelus holomelas Heller, 1923
- Cyrtotrachelus humeralis Heller, 1923
- Cyrtotrachelus javanus Heller, 1923
- Cyrtotrachelus lar Schoenherr, 1838
- Cyrtotrachelus longimanus (Fabricius, 1775)
- Cyrtotrachelus longipes Schönherr, 1838
- Cyrtotrachelus montanus Heller, 1923
- Cyrtotrachelus myrmidon Buquet in Guérin-Méneville, 1844
- Cyrtotrachelus nigrinus Heller, 1923
- Cyrtotrachelus nigrocinctus Faust, 1895
- Cyrtotrachelus nigrodiscalis Heller, 1923
- Cyrtotrachelus obscuriceps Chevrolat, 1882
- Cyrtotrachelus quadrimaculatus Buquet in Guérin-Méneville, 1844
- Cyrtotrachelus rex Chevrolat, 1882
- Cyrtotrachelus rufithorax Heller, 1923
- Cyrtotrachelus rufopectinipes Chevrolat, 1882
- Cyrtotrachelus subnotatus Voss, 1931
- Cyrtotrachelus sumatranus Heller, 1923
