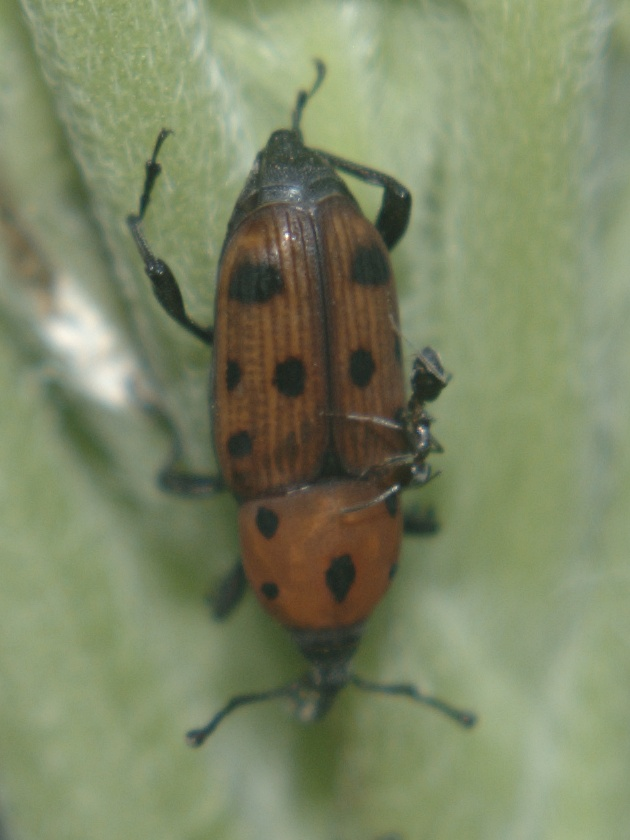

Scientific classification
- Kingdom: Animalia
- Phylum: Arthropoda
- Clade: Pancrustacea
- Class: Insecta
- Order: Coleoptera
- Suborder: Polyphaga
- Infraorder: Cucujiformia
- Superfamily: Curculionoidea
- Family: Curculionidae
- Genus: Rhodobaenus
- Species: R. tredecimpunctatus

Binomial name
- Rhodobaenus tredecimpunctatus (Illiger, 1794)

Synonyms
- Curculeones obscurus Voet, 1806; Curculio cribrarius Fabricius, 1798; Curculio leptocerus Panzer, 1798; Curculio quatuordecimpunctatus Panzer, 1798

= Rhodobaenus tredecimpunctatus =

Species of beetle

Rhodobaenus tredecimpunctatus, known generally as the ironweed curculio or cocklebur weevil, is a species of snout or bark beetle in the family Curculionidae. It is found in North America.

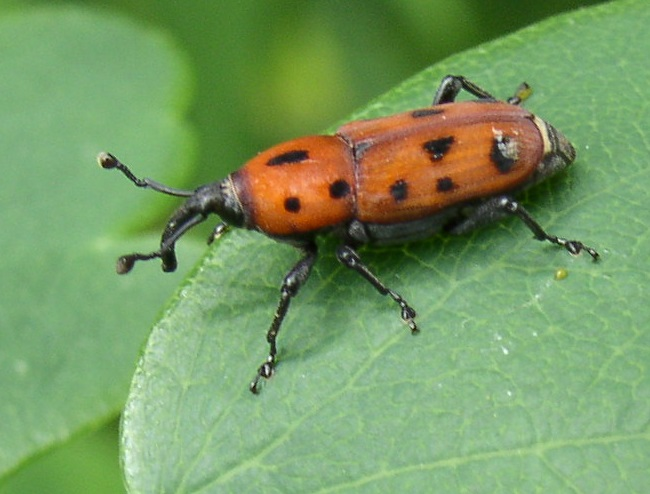
R. tredecimpunctatus
