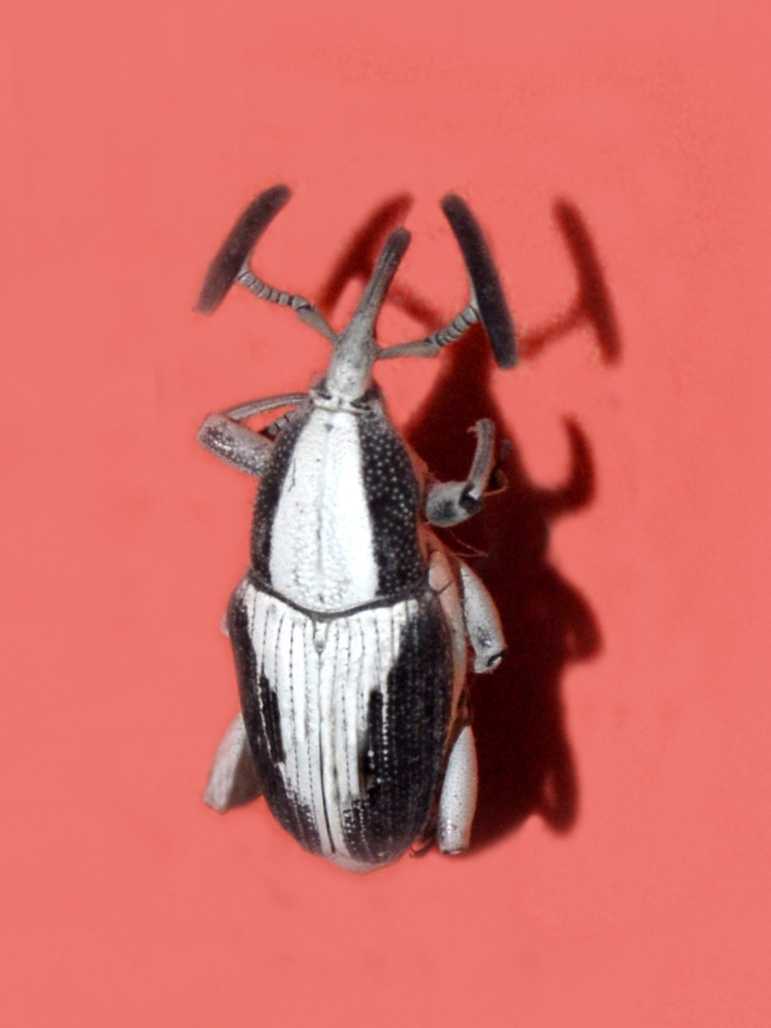
- Museum specimen of Cercidocerus securifer

Scientific classification
- Kingdom: Animalia
- Phylum: Arthropoda
- Clade: Pancrustacea
- Class: Insecta
- Order: Coleoptera
- Suborder: Polyphaga
- Infraorder: Cucujiformia
- Family: Curculionidae
- Tribe: Rhynchophorini
- Genus: Cercidocerus; Guérin-Méneville, F.E. 1833

= Cercidocerus =

Genus of beetles

Cercidocerus is a genus of the family Curculionidae.

== Species ==
- Cercidocerus albicollis
- Cercidocerus bimaculatus
- Cercidocerus bipunctatus
- Cercidocerus birmanicus
- Cercidocerus bisulcatus
- Cercidocerus carinensis
- Cercidocerus carinicollis
- Cercidocerus chevrolati
- Cercidocerus curvaturatus
- Cercidocerus distinctus
- Cercidocerus dohertyi
- Cercidocerus effetus
- Cercidocerus erubescens
- Cercidocerus erythroceus
- Cercidocerus eximius
- Cercidocerus fabricator
- Cercidocerus fabrilis
- Cercidocerus flavopictus
- Cercidocerus flavopunctatus
- Cercidocerus flavopunctulatus
- Cercidocerus funebris
- Cercidocerus hematopterus
- Cercidocerus heros
- Cercidocerus hispidulus
- Cercidocerus hypocrita
- Cercidocerus incertus
- Cercidocerus indicator
- Cercidocerus infernalis
- Cercidocerus interruptolineatus
- Cercidocerus lateralis
- Cercidocerus nervosus
- Cercidocerus niger
- Cercidocerus nigrolateralis
- Cercidocerus paraprodioctoides
- Cercidocerus pendleburyi
- Cercidocerus pictus
- Cercidocerus planicollis
- Cercidocerus prodioctoides
- Cercidocerus pygmaeus
- Cercidocerus rubromaculatus
- Cercidocerus rufipes
- Cercidocerus sanguinipes
- Cercidocerus saturatus
- Cercidocerus schoenherri
- Cercidocerus schonherri
- Cercidocerus securifer
- Cercidocerus securiferus
- Cercidocerus similis
- Cercidocerus sulcicollis
- Cercidocerus sutura-alba
- Cercidocerus trichopygus
- Cercidocerus viduus
- Cercidocerus x-rubrum
