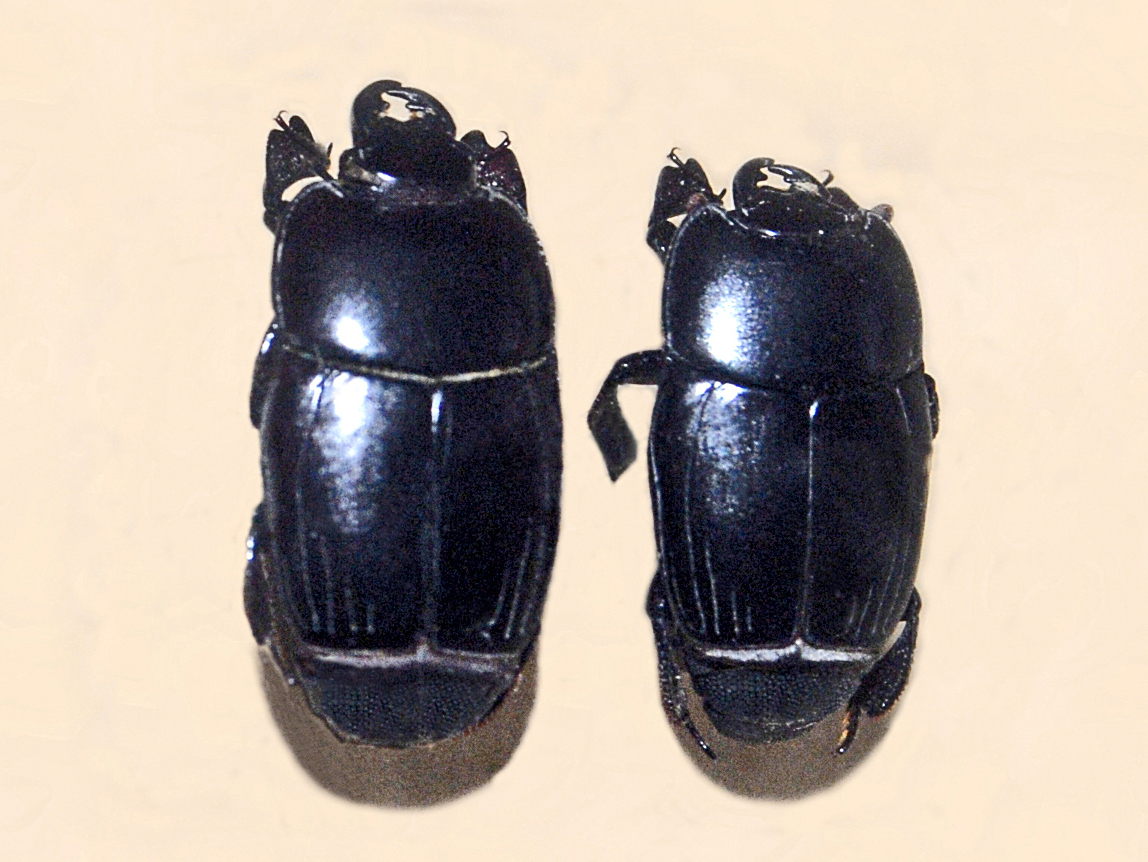
- Plaesius javanus from Mentawai Islands. Museum specimen

Scientific classification
- Domain: Eukaryota
- Kingdom: Animalia
- Phylum: Arthropoda
- Class: Insecta
- Order: Coleoptera
- Suborder: Polyphaga
- Infraorder: Staphyliniformia
- Family: Histeridae
- Genus: Plaesius
- Species: P. javanus

Binomial name
- Plaesius javanus Erichson, 1834

= Plaesius javanus =

Species of beetle

Plaesius javanus, the Jepson's beetle, is a species of clown beetles belonging to the family Histeridae.

== Description ==
Plaesius javanus can reach a length of about 14–15 millimetres (0.55–0.59 in). These beetles have a glossy black body, with long and curved jaws and short antennae. Frontlegs are thin and expanded laterally. Elytra show 4–6 longitudinal grooves. Two abdominal rear segments are exposed.

These predatory histerid beetles have been introduced in some countries for the control of the banana weevil borer (Cosmopolites sordidus).

== Distribution ==
This species is native to Southeastern Asia and Indonesia.

== Bibliography ==
- Mazur, Slawomir (1997) A world catalogue of the Histeridae (Coleoptera: Histeroidea), Genus, International Journal of Invertebrate Taxonomy (Supplement)(1996), database, NODC Taxonomic Code
- Ôhara, Masahiro, and Slawomir Mazur (2000) A revision of the genera of the tribe Platysomatini (Coleoptera, Histerida, Histerinae). Part 3. Redescriptions of the type species of Althanus, Caenolister, Idister, Diister, Placodes, Plaesius, Hyposolenus and Aulacosternus. Insecta Matsumurana (N.S.), vol. 57
