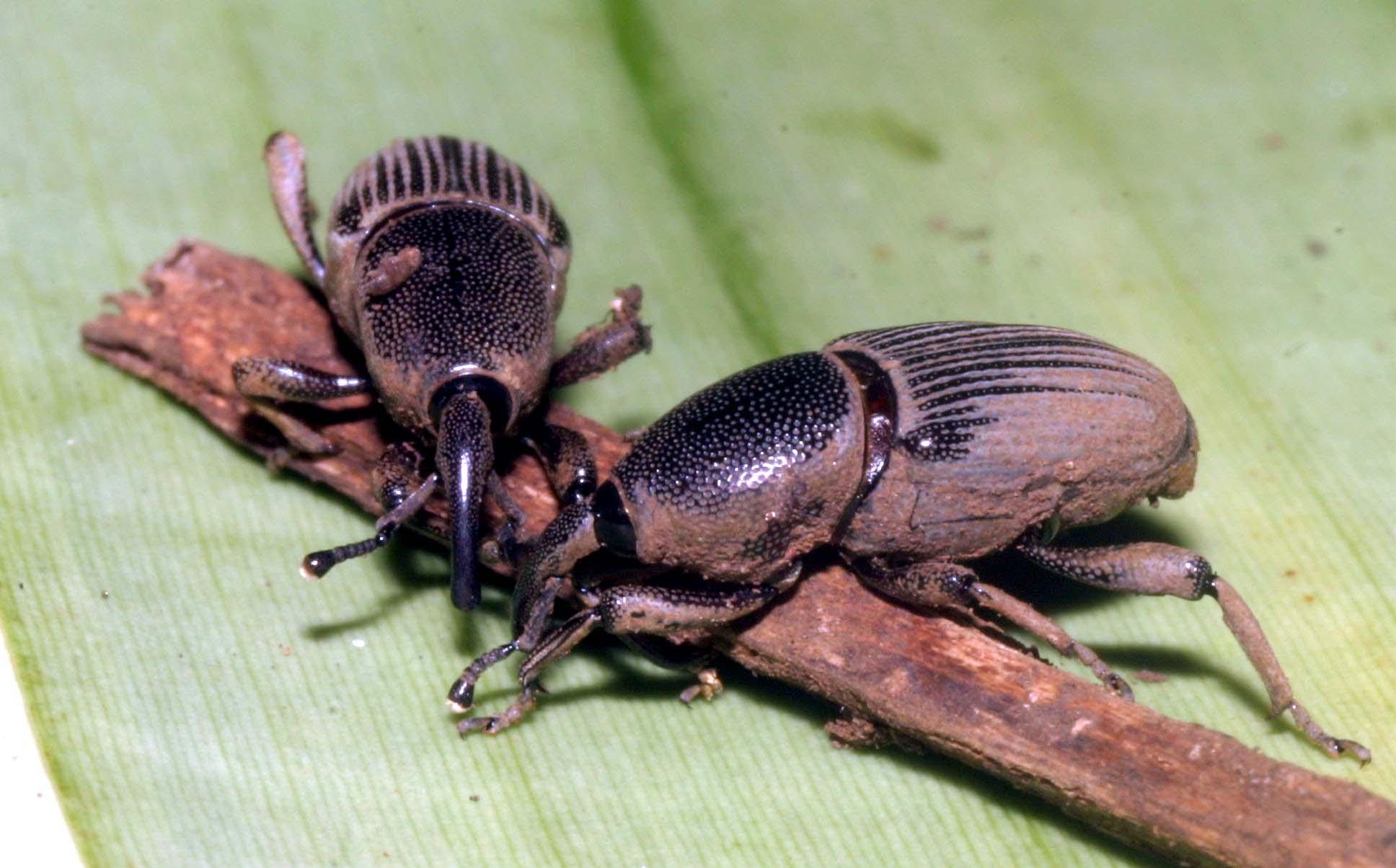
- Cosmopolites sordidus

Scientific classification
- Kingdom: Animalia
- Phylum: Arthropoda
- Clade: Pancrustacea
- Class: Insecta
- Order: Coleoptera
- Suborder: Polyphaga
- Infraorder: Cucujiformia
- Superfamily: Curculionoidea
- Family: Curculionidae
- Tribe: Sphenophorini
- Genus: Cosmopolites; Chevrolat, 1885

Species
- See text

= Cosmopolites =

Genus of beetles

Cosmopolites is a genus of true weevil in the Dryophthorinae subfamily and tribe Sphenophorini. The type species and most economically important is the banana weevil Cosmopolites sordidus.

== Species ==
The genus contains at least five described species, including the following:

- Cosmopolites sordidus (Germar, 1824) Marshall, G.A.K., 1930, banana weevil, banana stemborer
- Cosmopolites cribricollis Csiki, E., 1936
- Cosmopolites mendicus Csiki, E., 1936
- Cosmopolites pruinosus Heller, K.M., 1934
- Cosmopolites striatus Fairmaire, L., 1902
