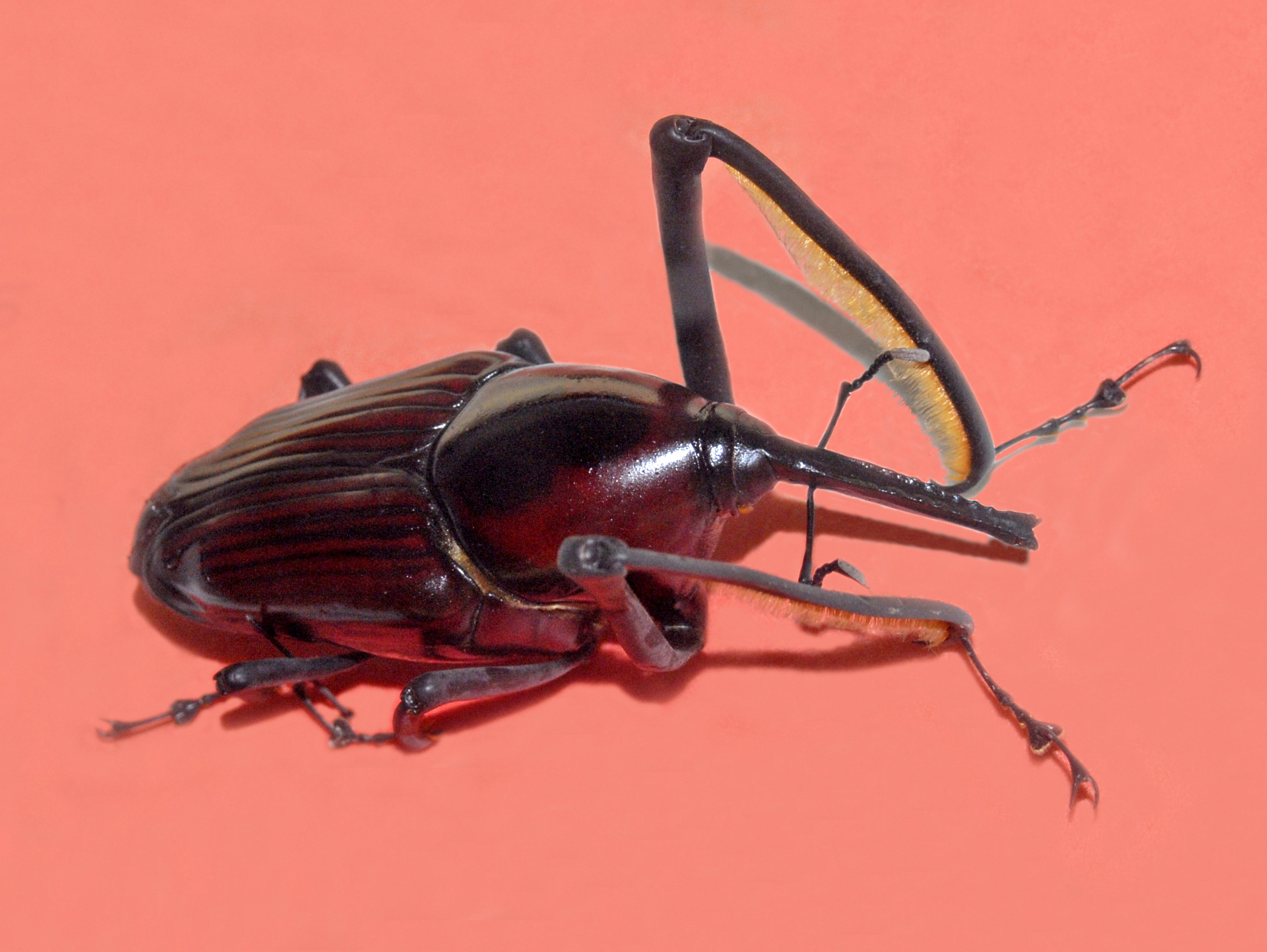
- Museum specimen of Cyrtotrachelus dux

Scientific classification
- Kingdom: Animalia
- Phylum: Arthropoda
- Class: Insecta
- Order: Coleoptera
- Suborder: Polyphaga
- Infraorder: Cucujiformia
- Family: Curculionidae
- Genus: Cyrtotrachelus
- Species: C. dux

Binomial name
- Cyrtotrachelus dux Boheman in Schönherr, 1845

Synonyms
- Cytrotrachelus rex Chevrolat, 1882; Cytrotrachelus buquetii var. dux Boheman, 1845

= Cyrtotrachelus dux =

Species of beetle

Cyrtotrachelus dux, the bamboo beetle or long-armed snout beetle, is a species of beetle belonging to the family Curculionidae.

== Description ==
Cyrtotrachelus dux can reach a length of 18–38 millimetres (0.71–1.50 in). The basic color of the body ranges from light brown to dark reddish brown. In the males the first pair of legs is very long. Larvae suck sap from tender bamboo shoots from May to October. These large beetles are considered a serious pest in bamboo plantation, frequently leading to the death of the host plants. Nematodes are commonly used to control this pest. These weevils are edible and are usually consumed in fried form by various ethnic groups.

== Distribution and habitat ==
This species is widespread in Asia, mainly in Bangladesh, China, Thailand, Myanmar, India, Sri Lanka and Nepal. These giant weevils live in forests and plantations of bamboo.
