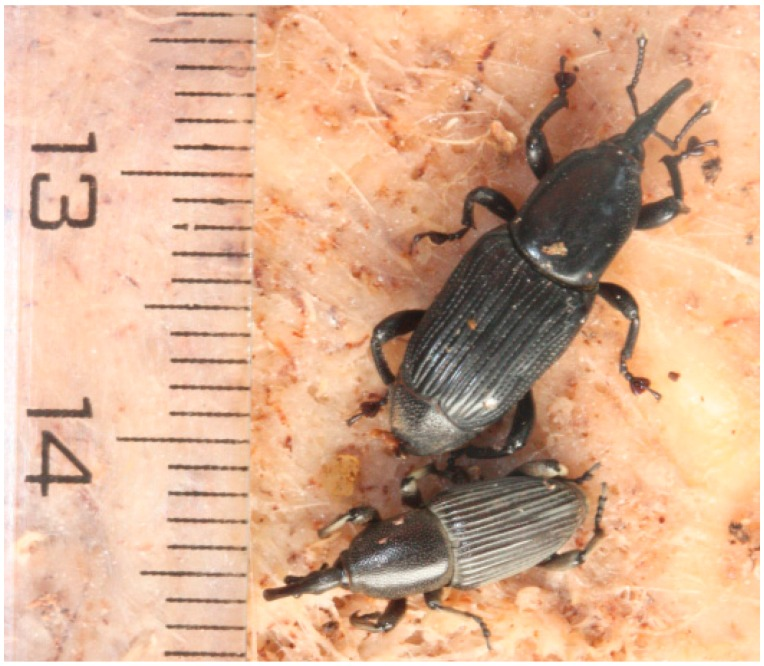
- Odoiporus longicollis

Scientific classification
- Domain: Eukaryota
- Kingdom: Animalia
- Phylum: Arthropoda
- Class: Insecta
- Order: Coleoptera
- Suborder: Polyphaga
- Infraorder: Cucujiformia
- Family: Curculionidae
- Subfamily: Dryophthorinae
- Tribe: Sphenophorini
- Genus: Odoiporus; Chevrolat, 1885

= Odoiporus =

Genus of beetles

Odoiporus is a genus of beetles belonging to the family Curculionidae.

The species of this genus are found in Southern Asia.

Species:

- Odoiporus gages E.Csiki, 1936
- Odoiporus glabricollis L.A.A.Chevrolat, 1882
- Odoiporus glabridiscus E.Csiki, 1936
- Odoiporus longicollis G.A.K.Marshall, 1930
- Odoiporus major K.M.Heller, 1898
- Odoiporus planipennis L.A.A.Chevrolat, 1882
- Odoiporus sulcicollis Günther, 1936
