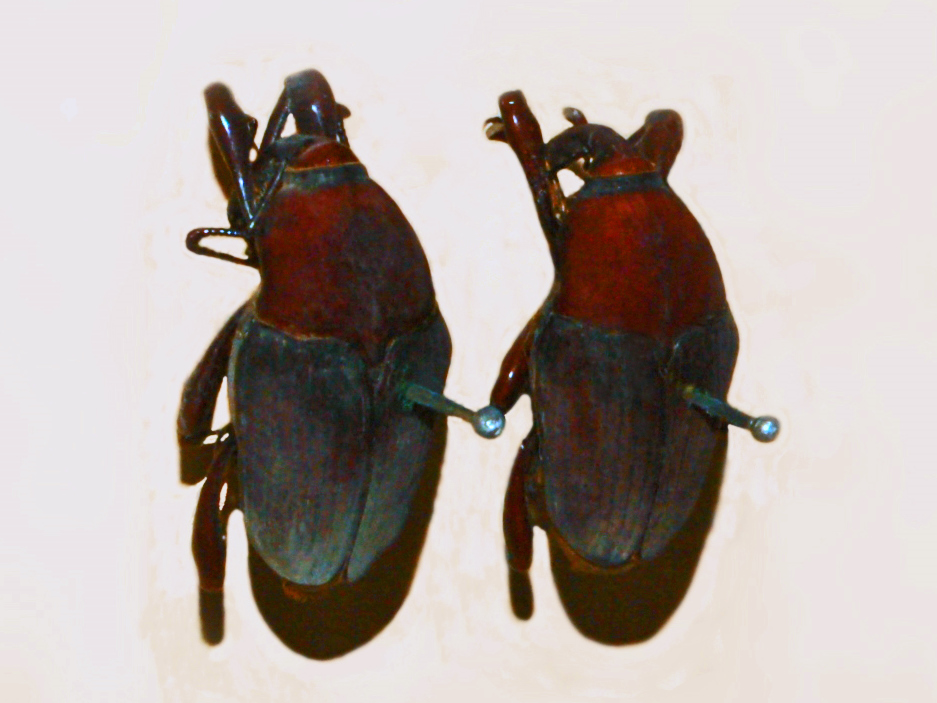
- Barystethus tropicus from New Guinea

Scientific classification
- Kingdom: Animalia
- Phylum: Arthropoda
- Class: Insecta
- Order: Coleoptera
- Suborder: Polyphaga
- Infraorder: Cucujiformia
- Family: Curculionidae
- Subfamily: Dryophthorinae
- Genus: Barystethus; Lacordaire, 1865

= Barystethus =

Genus of beetle

Barystethus is a genus of true weevils, family the Curculionidae. It occurs in New Guinea. The genus includes Barystethus cletusi, a pest of coconut.

== Species ==
Barystethus contains the following accepted species:

- Barystethus aberrans Günther, K., 1935
- Barystethus ater Pascoe, F.P., 1874
- Barystethus basalis Faust, J., 1899
- Barystethus chevrolati Faust, J., 1899
- Barystethus cletusi Heller, 1914
- Barystethus dispar Chevrolat, L.A.A., 1880
- Barystethus globithorax Heller, 1914
- Barystethus imparatus Heller, K.M., 1914
- Barystethus imperialis Heller, 1914
- Barystethus macilentus Heller, 1914
- Barystethus melanosoma Lacordaire, T., 1865
- Barystethus neopommeranus Guenther, 1943
- Barystethus parvulus Heller, 1914
- Barystethus puncticollis Heller, 1914
- Barystethus rufus Faust, J., 1899
- Barystethus semitomentosus Chevrolat, L.A.A., 1882
- Barystethus tropicus Pascoe, F.P., 1885
- Barystethus wahnesi Hartmann, 1900
