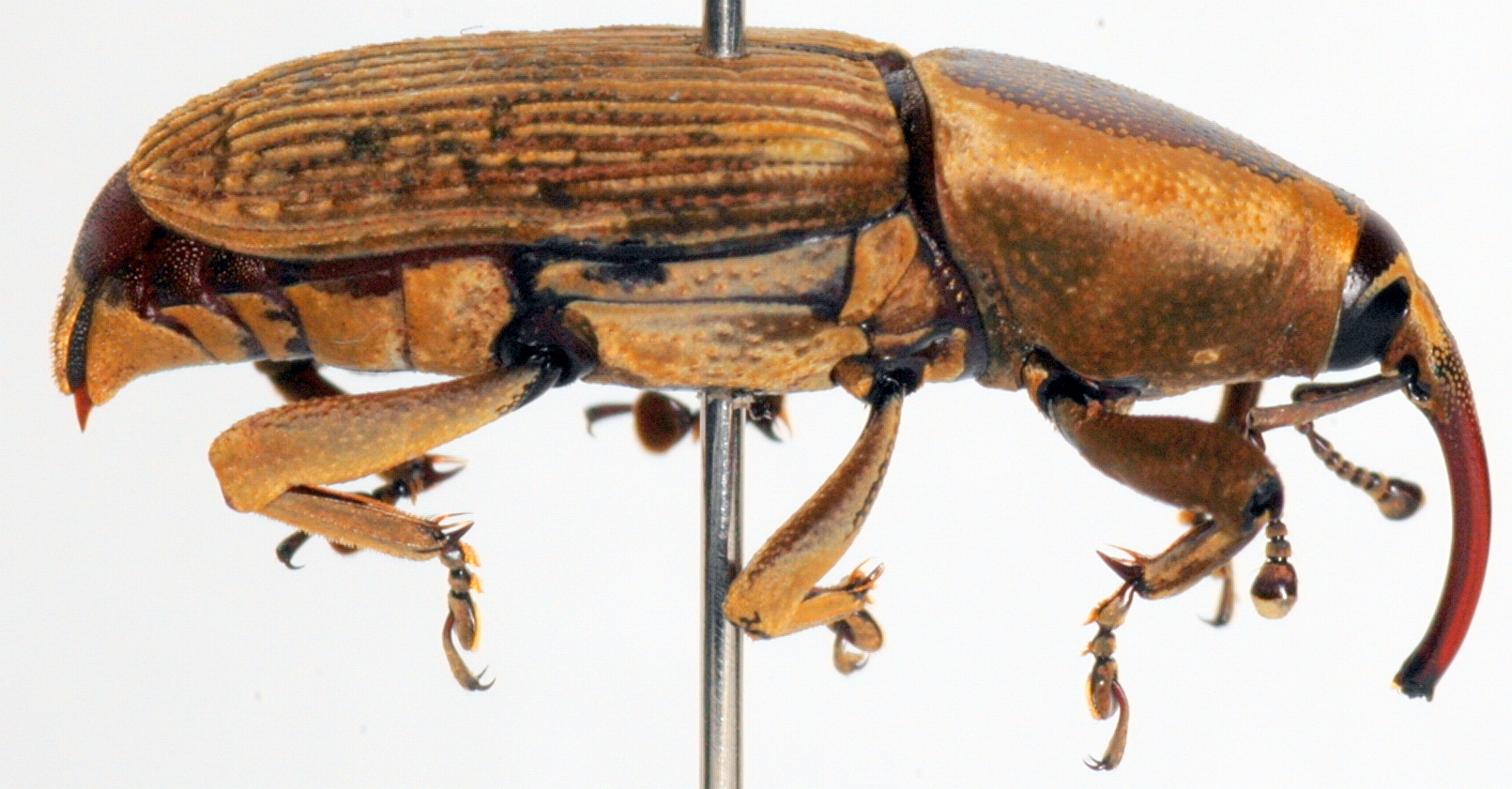
- Rhabdoscelus obscurus

Scientific classification
- Domain: Eukaryota
- Kingdom: Animalia
- Phylum: Arthropoda
- Class: Insecta
- Order: Coleoptera
- Suborder: Polyphaga
- Infraorder: Cucujiformia
- Family: Curculionidae
- Genus: Rhabdoscelus; Marshall, 1943

= Rhabdoscelus =

Genus of beetles

Rhabdoscelus is a genus of beetles belonging to the family Curculionidae.

The species of this genus are found in Australia.

Species:

- Rhabdoscelus interstitialis Zimmerman, 1993
- Rhabdoscelus obscurus (Boisduval, 1835)
- Rhabdoscelus similis Morimoto & Kojima, 2003
