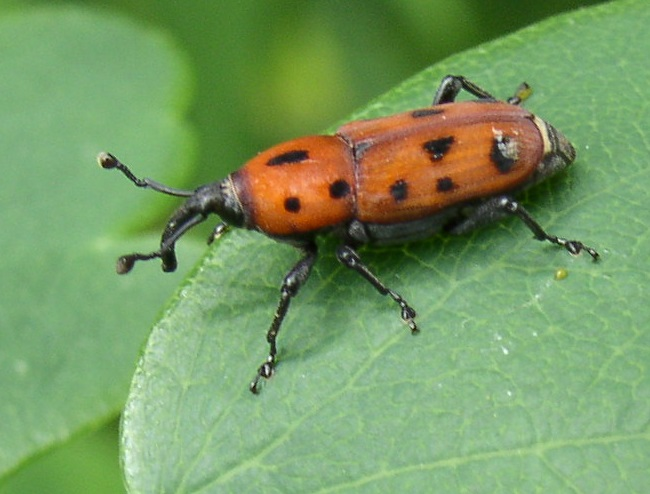
- Rhodobaenus tredecimpunctatus

Scientific classification
- Kingdom: Animalia
- Phylum: Arthropoda
- Clade: Pancrustacea
- Class: Insecta
- Order: Coleoptera
- Suborder: Polyphaga
- Infraorder: Cucujiformia
- Family: Curculionidae
- Tribe: Sphenophorini
- Genus: Rhodobaenus; LeConte, 1876

= Rhodobaenus =

Genus of beetles

Rhodobaenus is a genus of snout and bark beetles in the family Curculionidae. There are at least 130 described species in Rhodobaenus.

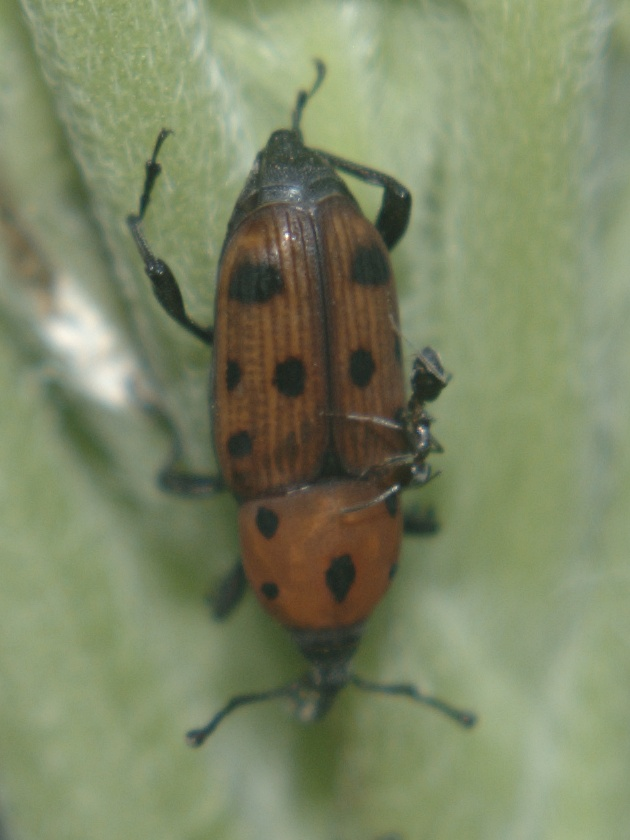
Rhodobaenus tredecimpunctatus

== See also ==
- List of Rhodobaenus species
