= List of invasive species in the Everglades =

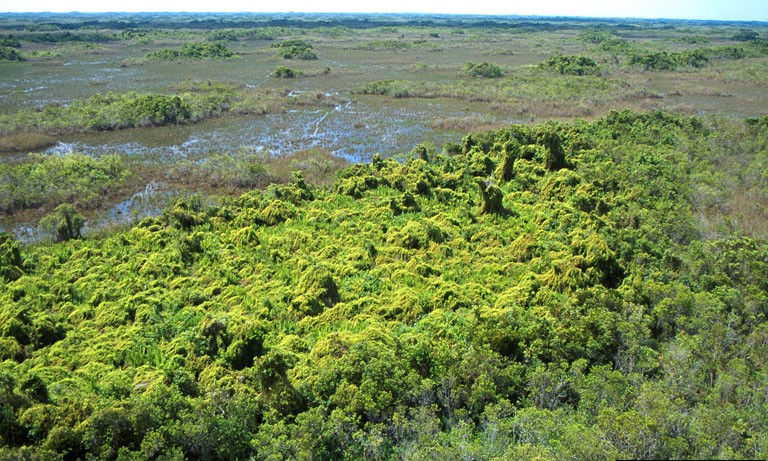
A tree island in the Everglades covered by Old World climbing fern.

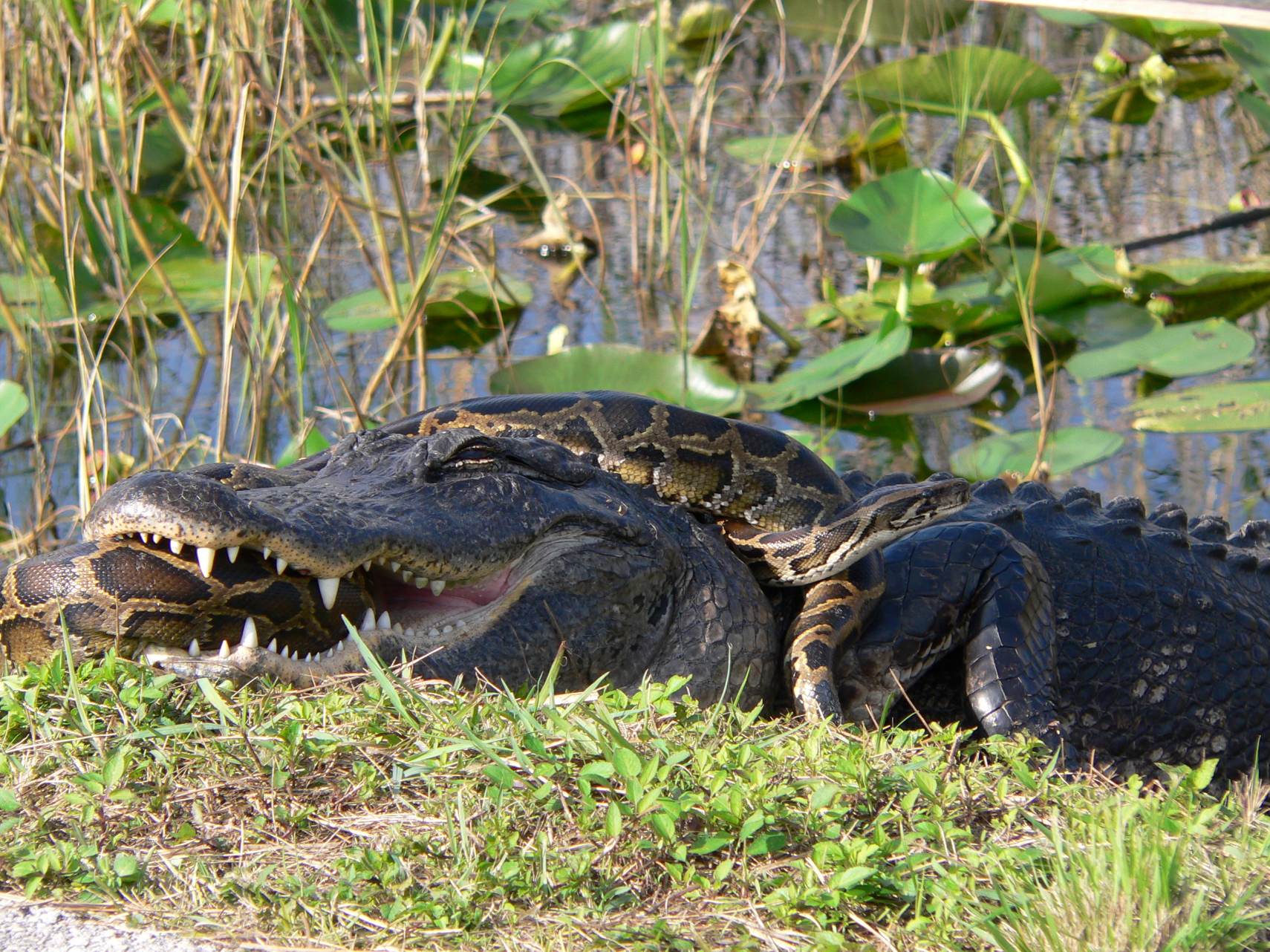
Everglades National Park staff photographed this image of an American alligator and Burmese python locked in a struggle.

Invasive species in the Everglades are exotic plants and animals that are not native to the area. Neobiota in the Everglades have aggressively adapted to regional wilderness conditions of southern Florida and are a sizeable part of the invasive species in Florida.

The Everglades are a massive watershed in the southern portion of the U.S. state of Florida that drains overflow from the vast shallow Lake Okeechobee that is in turn fed by the Kissimmee River. The overflow forms a very shallow river about 60 miles (100 km) wide and 100 miles (160 km) long that travels about half a mile per day. The network of ecosystems created by the Everglades are surrounded by urban areas to the east in the South Florida metropolitan area, to the west by Naples and Fort Myers, and to the south by Florida Bay, a marine environment that receives fresh water from and is maintained by the Everglades. As it is surrounded on three sides and close to a major transportation and shipping center, it is particularly vulnerable to the importation of exotic species.

In the 20th century, Florida experienced a population surge unparalleled in the U.S., accompanied by rapid urban expansion made possible by draining portions of the Everglades. Flood control became a priority and the Central & South Florida Flood Control Project, from 1947 to 1971, constructed over 1,400 miles (2,300 km) of canals and flood control structures in South Florida. The widespread building created new habitats and disturbed established plant and animal communities. Many of the new residents or tourists in Florida were responsible for introducing plant species to the area by accident, or deliberately to improve landscaping. Many animals have been introduced similarly, and have either escaped or been released to proliferate on their own. Several terms are used to identify non-native species: exotic, invader, immigrant, colonist, introduced, nonindigenous, and naturalized. "Naturalized" usually refers to species that have adapted to a region over a long period of time, while "invasive" refers to particularly destructive or aggressive species.

Approximately 26 percent of all fish, reptiles, birds, and mammals in South Florida are exotic—more than in any other part of the United States—and the region hosts one of the highest numbers of exotic plant species in the world. Many of the biological controls like weather, disease, and consumers that naturally limit plants in their native environments do not exist in the Everglades, causing many to grow larger and multiply far beyond their average numbers in their native habitats. Similarly, animals often do not find the predators or natural barriers to reproduction in the Everglades as they do where they originated, thus they often reproduce more quickly and efficiently. Concerns over the quality of the Everglades were raised in the beginning of the 20th century, and by 2000 a federally funded initiative was enacted that gave Everglades restoration the distinction of being the largest planned environmental rehabilitation in history. Exotic species control falls under the management of the U.S. Fish and Wildlife Service, which has been compiling and disseminating information about invasive species since 1994. Control of invasive species costs $500 million a year, but 1,700,000 acres (6,900 km^{2}) of land in South Florida remains infested.

== Plant species ==
As the fields of ecology and environmental studies develop, exotic species attract more attention and their effects become more apparent. Mid-20th century biology texts about invading species reflected more complacency than alarm, as contemporary wisdom about them assumed the host environment would be largely immune. Everglades biologist Thomas Lodge writes that in the 1960s, evidence of non-native plant and animal life in South Florida was present but not particularly "worthy of notice." Over the past decades, however, the number of exotic species and their spread has increased dramatically.

The Everglades hosts 1,301 species of native flora that are tropical or subtropical in nature, which arrived on the Florida peninsula about 5,000 years ago. Winds, water, and birds carried most of the tropical flora. The subtropical species spread from more northern locations. As of 2010 1,392 additional non-native plant species have been identified and established themselves in South Florida. A variety of avenues are available for species to be brought by humans deliberately or by accident: agricultural experiments, in shipping containers, or attached to vehicles. South Florida is a transportation hub for shipping and traffic between the U.S. and the Caribbean and Central and South America. In 1990, 333 million plants were brought into Miami International Airport. Both the United States Department of Agriculture (USDA) and the University of Florida Institute of Food and Agriculture Sciences (IFAS) experiment with plants in laboratories throughout Florida.

State, local, and federal government agencies spend millions of dollars to rid South Florida of invasive species and prevent more from entering the region. Plants that are imported to Florida are subject to classification as "Restricted" or "Prohibited", but a new designation is being considered "Not Authorized Pending Plant Risk Analysis", to allow scientists to assess what damage exotic plants may cause to the South Florida environment. A nonprofit organization named The Florida Exotic Pest Plant Council lists exotic species as belonging in Category I: "altering native plant communities by displacing native species, changing community structures or ecological functions, or hybridizing with natives"; and Category II: "increased in abundance or frequency but have not yet altered Florida plant communities to the extent shown by Category I". More than 100 species have been placed in Category I, but a few have been singled out for the potential to cause the most destruction based on how rapidly they reproduce, their displacement of native flora by crowding, shading, or fire, excellent adaptations to conditions in the Everglades, and the potential to spread (or evidence that they have spread) into remote areas of the Everglades.

| Scientific name | Common name(s) | Origin / Year(s) introduced | Purpose of introduction |
|---|---|---|---|
| Melaleuca quinquenervia | Melaleuca, paperbark, tea tree, cajeput, punk tree, white bottlebrush tree | Australia, New Guinea, the Solomon Islands / 1906 | Landscaping, drainage |
| Melaleuca quinquenervia | Melaleuca tree seeds were scattered by aircraft in order to drain flooded portions of the Everglades. They were considered excellent landscaping trees as late as 1970 and planted along canals to stabilize soil or act as windbreaks. They grow significantly taller than where they originate, very densely—not allowing wading birds with large wingspans to fly between them—and very rapidly. They are very tolerant of fire and flooded conditions. One tree is capable of producing 20 million seeds year-round. Authorities are attempting to limit the spread of melaleuca by quarantining stands of trees, felling established ones, and applying herbicide. They are also releasing the melaleuca psyllid (Boreioglycaspis melaleucae), and the melaleuca snout weevil (Oxyops vitiosa) that can kill seedlings, that has resulted in the reduction of 85 percent of melaleuca growth in some places over the past 10 years, allowing four times the plant diversity in these locations. Melaleuca control is considered a major accomplishment by the South Florida Water Management District: between 1993 and 2008, the estimated acreage of melaleuca has decreased from 500,000 acres (2,000 km^{2}) to 273,000 acres (1,100 km^{2}) | | |
| Lygodium microphyllum | Old World climbing fern | Tropical Asia, Africa, and Australia / Observed already established in 1958 | Unknown purpose |
| Lygodium microphyllum | The Old World climbing fern has taken over tree islands in the Loxahatchee National Wildlife Refuge in the northern Everglades, completely blanketing some of them, and crowding smaller vegetation by shading native seedlings and overwhelming trees. There is also evidence that it fatally traps medium- and large-sized animals such as deer and turtles. While fire may burn some of the Old World climbing fern, portions of burning fern may break loose and spread fires more quickly. "Fire ladders" are created when ferns grow into the forest canopy, above the line that cypress and other trees naturally tolerate fire damage. The thick rachis fern mats may also trap animals attempting to flee fires. There is no definitive plan to rid ecologically sensitive areas in South Florida of this exotic plant, although herbicides and controlled fires are being explored. Biological agents such as brown lygodium moth (Neomusotima conspurcatalis) and leaf-gall mite (Floracarus perrepae), that feed on and destroy parts of the climbing ferns, were released in 2008, and their overall effects are under evaluation. | | |
| Schinus terebinthifolius Branch of a shrub showing elliptical leaves and bunches of green and red berries | Brazilian pepper, Florida holly, Christmas berry, pepper tree | Brazil, Argentina, Paraguay / 1840s | Landscaping |
| Schinus terebinthifolius Branch of a shrub showing elliptical leaves and bunches of green and red berries | Brazilian pepper was marketed as a southern alternative to holly. Birds and small mammals have spread its seeds by eating the red berries and expelling them from their digestive tracts, allowing the plants to establish in very remote areas that are difficult to reach and hamper control efforts. The shrub is very successful in highly disturbed areas such as farmland, canals, under powerlines, and natural areas following hurricanes. Its dense structure allows it to form concentrated thickets that displace native vegetation, including some endangered plants, and at its densest keeps wading birds from their migratory feeding locations. It is a particular danger to pine rockland ecosystems, which are very rare outside of Everglades National Park. Brazilian pepper is physically removed with large landmoving equipment and the largest plants treated with herbicides. | | |
| Casuarina equisetifolia, Casuarina glauca, Casuarina cunninghamiana | Australian pine, beefwood, ironwood, she-oak, horsetail tree | Australia, South Pacific Islands, Southeast Asia / Late 19th century | Landscaping |
| Casuarina equisetifolia, Casuarina glauca, Casuarina cunninghamiana | Three species of tree are considered collectively to be Australian pines. They were planted as windbreaks along canals and agricultural fields, and as shade trees in the middle of the 20th century. They are salt tolerant and grow well in beach areas, displacing native vegetation that prevents coastal erosion, particularly following disturbances like tropical storms. The native habitat of the endangered Cape Sable seaside sparrow (Ammodramus maritimus mirabilis) is directly threatened by the Australian pine. Native seedlings are discouraged by the shade given by Australian pines and furthermore smothered by the dense litter shed by the trees. The Australian pine's shallow roots can disrupt beach nesting animals such as sea turtles and American crocodiles (Crocodylus acutus). Herbicides are effective in removing Australian pines. Fire has also proven effective but is not easily controlled. | | |
| Colubrina asiatica | Latherleaf, Asiatic or common colubrina, hoop with, Asian snakeroot | Brought to Jamaica from Asian traders in the 1850s / Naturalized in South Florida by 1933 | Medicinal supplies |
| Colubrina asiatica | Latherleaf grows in dense mats that crowd and shade native vegetation, threatening several endangered plants. It has successfully spread to every protected area in the Florida Keys, and is well entrenched in remote areas of Everglades National Park where it threatens coastal hardwood forests and mangrove islands. Although it grows easily, it does not spread prolifically. Latherleaf is controlled by removing the established plants physically and checking periodically for young shoots. | | |
| Eichhornia crassipes A plant floating on the surface of water, showing orbicular curved leaves and purple flowers | Water hyacinth, water orchid | Amazon basin / 1884–1890 | Waterscaping |
| Eichhornia crassipes A plant floating on the surface of water, showing orbicular curved leaves and purple flowers | Water hyacinths are free-floating and have been a particular problem in northern Florida waterways, but since they began to grow in the Everglades, their rapid reproduction (they can double their population every six to 18 days and will increase the coverage of surface water by 25 percent a month if gone unchecked) has impeded the controlled release of water by blocking canals and water control devices. They negatively affect water quality and can crowd other types of natural aquatic vegetation. They are mostly limited to man-made structures like canals, and herbicides have proven to be the most efficient method of controlling water hyacinths. | | |
| Pistia stratiotes | Water lettuce, water cabbage | Africa or South America / In Florida by 1774 | Possibly accidental |
| Pistia stratiotes | Water lettuce is similar to water hyacinths in that it is also free-floating, reproduces rapidly, blocks canals and water control devices, and can form mats that block sunlight and oxygen to plants and animals under water. Authorities use the same methods to eradicate water lettuce as they do water hyacinths. | | |
| Neyraudia reynaudiana | Burma reed, silk reed, cane grass, false reed | Southern Asia / 1916 | Escaped from USDA test gardens |
| Neyraudia reynaudiana | Burma reed is a grass with large, dry plume-like flowerets that invades the pine rockland ecosystem—one of the most endangered habitats in the state—feeding fires. While pine rocklands are maintained by fire, Burma reed can reach 12 feet (3.7 m) tall and burns so hot and high—flames can reach 30 feet (9.1 m)—that it can eradicate the native Pinus elliottii var. densa or slash pine. It spreads prolifically; one plant can produce 120,000 seeds. | | |
| Hydrilla verticillata Flat shallow body of water with an airboat in the background and two people standing on it holding plants they apparently pulled from the water, which in the foreground is full of plants with long strands and short even pinnate formations | Hydrilla, water thyme, Florida elodea, waterweed | Sri Lanka / 1950s | Possibly spread from aquariums, found on every continent except Antarctica |
| Hydrilla verticillata Flat shallow body of water with an airboat in the background and two people standing on it holding plants they apparently pulled from the water, which in the foreground is full of plants with long strands and short even pinnate formations | Like the other water plants, hydrilla reproduces rapidly. Although it is not free floating, it grows quickly to the water surface, and if it breaks apart it can form new plants from fragments. It clogs open waterways, blocks sunlight, lowers dissolved oxygen, and otherwise changes water chemistry. Hydrilla also harms fisheries and zooplankton populations. The Kissimmee Chain of Lakes, including Kissimmee, Hatchineha, and Tohopekaliga, have been severely infested with hydrilla. It is managed by being physically removed, and taking all pieces of plants from waterways is integral to avoiding future infestations. The efficacy of herbicides is dependent upon a variety of factors, but their application is credited with, if not eliminating hydrilla in the Kissimmee Chain of Lakes, at least keeping it to a manageable and acceptable presence. Sometimes hydrilla is treated by the release of grass carp (Ctenopharyngodon idella) that eat it. Carp, however, may also eat native vegetation, so they are released only where their impact would not be detrimental. | | |
| Dioscorea bulbifera | Air potato, potato yam, air yam | Asia: introduced during slave trade / In Florida by 1905 | Escaped from USDA test gardens, landscaping |
| Dioscorea bulbifera | The air potato is an aggressively growing vine that exhibits tubers on the outside rather than underground, which can promote its rapid growth when they fall to the ground. It successfully grows in dryer conditions in South Florida, such as hardwood hammocks and pine rocklands, often completely covering native vegetation well into the canopy region, and is particularly successful after disturbances such as hurricanes, overtaking regions before native plants have an opportunity to grow back. | | |
| Cupaniopsis anacardioides Short tree with full bushy leaves of indiscriminate shape | Carrotwood, beach tamarind, green-leaved tamarind, tuckeroo tree | Australia / 1960s | Landscaping |
| Cupaniopsis anacardioides Short tree with full bushy leaves of indiscriminate shape | Carrotwood grows easily in many South Florida habitats, including coastal dunes, beaches, marshes, pine rocklands, hammocks, mangrove forests, and cypress swamps. It is spread by birds eating the seeds and dropping them throughout the region. Little is known about carrotwood trees, but for their ability to adapt to multiple types of habitats and conditions pervasive in South Florida, they are listed as an invasive plant with potential for destruction. | | |
| Rhodomyrtus tomentosa Shrub showing short elliptical leaves and small pink flowers and white greenish buds | Downy rose myrtle, downy myrtle, hill gooseberry, hill guava | Asia / Established by 1924 | Landscaping |
| Rhodomyrtus tomentosa Shrub showing short elliptical leaves and small pink flowers and white greenish buds | Downy rose myrtle was recently added to priority invasive species lists for its tendency to overtake pine rockland ecosystems. Typically pine rocklands consist of slash pines towering over saw palmetto (Serenoa repens) understory shrubs and small herbs. It is a system that is maintained by regular fires. Rose myrtle, however, has been noted throughout South Florida, for taking over the role of saw palmetto, and its spread is exacerbated by fire. They are furthermore showing resistance to previously effective herbicides. | | |

== Animal species ==
Although the general effects of invasive animals is not as profound as plants, they are more noticeable in many instances and a constant reminder of the many exotic species in the region. A wildlife biologist and several construction workers near Homestead Air Force Base witnessed a scene where several iguanas sunning themselves in a canal were attacked by a spectacled caiman, to the surprise of all.

About 12,500 species of insects are native to Florida, most of which naturally flew into the region from the Caribbean or Southeastern United States. An additional 1,000 have been identified as exotic. Insects create about $1 billion of damage to structures and agriculture in Florida each year. The tide of arriving insects is nearly impossible to control with the volume of goods and shipments coming into South Florida. Imported citrus is a major avenue for damaging insects. Twenty-one species have been imported and released to act as biological control agents: to impede the growth of invasive plants or counter the effects of other insects. Others, such as the Madagascan hissing cockroach (Gromphadorhina portentosa) and European cricket (Acheta domesticus) are sold as pets or fishing bait, and are then released into backyards. Similarly, aquatic invertebrates such as mussels, clams, snails, and melania find their ways into local waters from the bottoms of ships or in bilge holds. The aquarium trade also supplies enthusiasts with exotic species which are dumped or escape into waterways.

Excluding insects and other arthropods, 192 exotic animal species have established themselves in Florida as of 2009. More than 50 species of fish have been introduced. Early recorded species were the pike killifish (Belonesox belizanus) and oscar (Astronotus ocellatus). The extensive network of canals throughout South Florida allows many species to disperse more readily than they would under natural conditions as many regions in the Everglades go dry each year or experience extended drought periods. The overall impact of exotic fishes on the native populations and habitats is largely unknown.

The Florida Fish and Wildlife Conservation Commission (FWC) initiated a task force to concentrate on identifying the most invasive animals. The agency created a list of "Reptiles of Concern" for the Burmese python, African rock python (Python sebae), amethystine python (Simalia amethystinus), reticulated python (Malayopython reticulatus), green anaconda (Eunectes murinus), and Nile monitor. Florida also began requiring owners to pay a permit fee of $100 a year and place microchips on the animals. These predators are included on the list for their formidable size and aggressive natures; animals that were in the Everglades before the list was created, however, are breeding in the wild. Burmese Pythons have become of particular concern as they are starting to adapt to new environment, they easily hide, and in recent years, the population of other species is declining, particularly in the Everglades. To combat the number of exotic snakes in the U.S., and specifically in South Florida, the U.S. Department of the Interior added four species of snakes—the Burmese python, both subspecies of the African rock python (northern and southern), and the yellow anaconda (Eunectes notaeus)—to Lacey Act provisions, making their import into the U.S. illegal, in 2012.

Exotic birds do not attract the same amount of attention. They too have been brought to Florida as part of the pet trade and escape, get released by dealers attempting to avoid quarantine restrictions, or escape from damaged cages and artificial habitats during tropical storms. Typically, however, most nonindigenous birds live closer to populated areas; some populations of birds establish themselves but decline for unapparent reasons.

More than 50 species of exotic mammals have been recorded in South Florida, at least 19 of which are self-sustaining. Colonies of feral mammals are established in or around the Everglades, including dogs, pigs, and cats. Wild animals native to other parts of the U.S. have also been established, including nine-banded armadillos (Dasypus novemcinctus), coyotes (Canis latrans), and jaguarundi (Herpailurus yaguarondi).

Florida has enacted laws to prohibit the release of exotic animals into the wild. To dissuade people from dumping animals, local authorities have begun holding "Nonnative Amnesty Days" in several Florida locations where pet owners who are no longer willing or able to take care of non-traditional pets such as snakes, lizards, amphibians, birds, and mammals—excluding dogs, cats, and ferrets—can deposit animals without being prosecuted for illegal dumping of exotic species. The FWC has furthermore allowed hunters permits to capture Reptiles of Concern in a specific hunting season in wildlife management areas, euthanize the animals immediately and sell the meat and hides.

=== Invertebrates ===
| Scientific name | Common name(s) | Origin / Year(s) introduced | Method of introduction |
|---|---|---|---|
| Paratachardina lobata lobata Paratachardina pseudolobata | Lobate lac scale | India, Sri Lanka / 1999 | Unknown |
| Paratachardina lobata lobata Paratachardina pseudolobata | Lobate lac scale insects infest at least 94 species of native trees in Florida, particularly the wax myrtle (Myrica cerifera), cocoplum (Chrysobalanus icaco), and buttonwood (Conocarpus erectus). Severe infestations can kill trees and shrubs, and dense infestations have been found in hardwood hammocks which are defined by the diversity of trees. The infestations are recent and long-term effects in protected and threatened areas are under study as of 2005. | | |
| Metamasius callizona | Bromeliad beetle, evil weevil, Mexican weevil | Mexico and Central America / 1989 | Possibly imported with Tillandsia bromeliads |
| Metamasius callizona | This member of the Dryophthoridae family causes specific damage to bromeliads, which are ecosystems unto themselves as the water they hold feeds a host of smaller amphibians and insects. Fifteen species of bromeliads grow naturally throughout the Everglades, and they are also used as ornamental landscaping in residential areas. The bromeliad beetle moved from its initial point of infestation to 12 counties within a decade by being transported by people and subsequently dispersing themselves. They have become established in Big Cypress National Preserve, Florida Panther National Wildlife Refuge, and Fakahatchee Strand Preserve State Park. Adults lay eggs in bromeliad stems and larvae pupate in the stems, possibly causing the plants to detach from their host trees. Adults also feed on the leaves of bromeliads. Not all species of bromeliads are affected by the beetle, but 10 are, particularly Tillandsia utriculata and Tillandsia fasciculata, that have been devastated and listed as endangered species because of the infestation. Insecticides are not preferred because they may kill native insects that are natural components of the microsystems associated with bromeliads. Authorities have released Lixadmontia franki, a fly that may control the bromeliad beetle. | | |
| Pomacea insularum | Island apple snail | South America / 2000s | Dumped from aquariums |
| Pomacea insularum | Island apple snails are very similar in habit and appearance to the indigenous Florida apple snail (Pomacea paludosa), but it has few predators in the Everglades. It eats macrophytes on such a great scale that it can alter water ecology and cause algal blooms. It grows larger than Pomacea paludosa—some have reported measuring the size of tennis balls—and uses the same regions for eating and laying eggs. Their eggs have been found on the same plant stalks as the Florida apple snails' causing Everglades biologists concern: Pomacea paludosa is the primary food the endangered Everglades snail kite (Rostrhamus sociabilis plumbeus), that has a beak specifically used for the size of the indigenous Pomacea paludosa and may not be able to eat island apple snails. Adult island apple snails and egg colonies are physically removed, but they are a recent infestation and studies are ongoing to determine how far they have spread and the best ways to eradicate them. | | |
| Corbicula fluminea | Asiatic clam | China / In Florida by 1961 | Possible importation of food for Asian laborers in British Columbia |
| Corbicula fluminea | Asiatic clams have been in North America for decades, but only recently in South Florida—specifically in Lake Okeechobee. They can reproduce very rapidly and live successfully in low-quality water. Large beds of clams can displace food and nesting sources for native aquatic animals, and their leftover shells can accumulate on lake and river floors. Black crappie (Pomoxis nigromaculatus) feed on Chironomidae that are unable to burrow and establish their own populations due to overabundance of Asiatic clams. The clams furthermore proliferate around water control devices, canal locks, pipes, mesh dividers, and other man-made structures that release water through South Florida. They have, however, proven to be sufficient food sources for ducks and efficiently clean water in eutrophic lakes. | | |

=== Fish ===
| Scientific name | Common name(s) | Origin / Year(s) introduced | Method of introduction |
|---|---|---|---|
| Pterygoplichthys multiradiatus Pterygoplichthys disjunctivus | Sailfin, suckermouth catfish, plecostomus | South America / 1950s | Dumped from aquariums |
| Pterygoplichthys multiradiatus Pterygoplichthys disjunctivus | Suckermouth catfishes are efficient aquarium cleaners that eat benthic algae and weeds. They prefer slow-moving water, canals, lakes, and ponds. In the wild, they can grow considerably larger than their aquarium counterparts and create large burrows into canal and lake beds, which compromise the integrity of shorelines. Their browsing on algae and weeds competes with much smaller native fishes, and birds that attempt to eat them can be harmed by the spiny dorsal fins; 20 strangled brown pelicans were found to have attempted to swallow suckermouth catfishes whole. A study of P. multiradiatus from 1997 to 2008 concluded that the fish had not had any major detrimental effects on the principal native fishes in southeast Florida canals. | | |
| Clarias batrachus | Walking catfish | Thailand / 1960s | Escaped or released from stocks |
| Clarias batrachus | Walking catfish can survive out of water for days as long as they remain moist, and can survive in hypoxic water, or water with low dissolved oxygen levels, by breathing air. They are aggressive feeders that browse on smaller native fishes, and fish and crustacean eggs when food is plentiful. When parts of the Everglades go dry seasonally, walking catfish will eat anything they find. They have been recorded migrating to and depleting fish stocks, prompting aquaculture farmers to fence fish pools to keep them out. They furthermore carry enteric septicemia and can pass it to native and stocked fishes. | | |
| Cichlasoma urophthalmus | Mayan cichlid | Mexico, Central America / 1983 | Dumped from aquariums |
| Cichlasoma urophthalmus | Mayan cichlids are one of 17 species of Cichlidae that are found in the waters in and around the Everglades. They rapidly expanded from two sites near mangrove islands in Florida Bay to being present across the Everglades south of the Tamiami Trail, in marine and brackish water, including freshwater habitats thought to be devoid of exotic species. Their successful establishment led to their being a sport fishing attraction as they can grow quite large in Florida and respond well to fishing lures and nets. They eat a variety of grasses and smaller fishes, invertebrates, and eggs, including those of the Florida apple snail, the primary food of the endangered Everglades snail kite. They are in turn food for wading birds such as snowy egrets (Egretta thula). | | |
| Oreochromis aureus | Blue tilapia, Israeli tilapia | Africa, Middle East / 1961 | Escaped from stocks for aquatic plant control |
| Oreochromis aureus | Blue tilapia have spread throughout Florida, in both freshwater and brackish environments, and have established a presence in Big Cypress National Preserve and Everglades National Park. They create large nest craters in shallow waters about 2 feet (0.61 m) wide, visibly altering native plant communities and impeding the spawning of native fishes. | | |

=== Reptiles ===
| Scientific name | Common name(s) | Origin / Year(s) introduced | Method of introduction |
|---|---|---|---|
| Python bivittatus | Burmese python | Southeast Asia / 1979 | Imported by/through pet trade |
| Python bivittatus | Perhaps no other invasive species has attracted as much media attention as Burmese pythons in Florida, particularly after spectacular photographs and eyewitness accounts of struggles between native alligators and these snakes were released. Burmese pythons have voracious appetites and have been found to eat animals ranging in size from wrens to white-tailed deer. A study published in 2011 found some mammal populations have dropped over 90 percent in areas populated by pythons. Burmese pythons share the top of the food chain in the Everglades with alligators and prey on 39 endangered species and 41 additional rare species. They continue to be sold as pets; around 6,000 pythons were imported into Miami from 2003 to 2005. They are removed immediately from Everglades National Park; as of 2007, national park staff report extracting a total of 600 pythons. Another 300 were captured in 2008 alone. A park biologist estimated that between 5,000 and 180,000 Burmese pythons live in wilderness areas in South Florida. | | |
| Gekko gecko | Tokay gecko | Southeast Asia / 1965 | Imported by/through pet trade |
| Gekko gecko | The Tokay Gecko was first introduced in the Everglades around 1965, in an attempt to exterminate cockroaches. However, in the wild, the gecko will eat lizards, frogs, birds, and other native species. They are nocturnal and territorial. A female can lay a pair of eggs every four to five months. The tokay gecko can become up to one foot in length and live up to 10 years. Florida wildlife officials have called the gecko a mild threat to native species, although there is no large effort to eradicate them. | | |
| Anolis equestris | Knight anole | Cuba / 1952 | Unknown |
| Anolis equestris | The knight anole was first introduced in the Everglades around 1952. It is unknown how the anole first arrived in Florida, though it likely was initially brought as a pet or hitchhiked on a boat. In the wild, the gecko will eat native species such as frogs, bugs, fruit, and birds. They have been known to displace the Anolis carolinensis or green anole, a native species to the Everglades. A female can lay up to 4 clutches of 2 eggs annually. The knight anole can become up to 20 inches in length and live up to 16 years (average life span of 8 years). Knight anoles are a member of the iguana family. | | |
| Iguana iguana | Green iguana | Central America / 1960s | Imported by/through pet trade |
| Iguana iguana | Iguanas have expanded rapidly in the Everglades by eating native vegetation and reproducing very efficiently in urban areas following disturbances accompanied by new plant growth. Following Hurricane Andrew in 1992, there was a significant increase in sightings of iguanas near residential areas. They are drawn to areas near water and build burrows by digging horizontally into inclines. They often live in colonies and their digging worsens erosion near canals, levees, and other man-made structures, leading to canal and levee instability. Although they are primarily herbivores, they have also preyed upon tree snails, which can be native only to single tree islands or have very limited ranges, including Orthalicus reses and Liguus fasciatus which are threatened and rare species. | | |
| Varanus niloticus | Nile monitor | Africa / 1990 | Imported by/through pet trade |
| Varanus niloticus | Nile monitors have established themselves in a region surrounding Cape Coral—including a bird sanctuary at J. N. "Ding" Darling National Wildlife Refuge on Sanibel Island—as pets that have been released or escaped. Between 2000 and 2004, 60,000 monitors were imported in South Florida. They are excellent swimmers and can run quickly and climb. They have an affinity for eating eggs and pose a specific danger to ground-burrowing animals such as burrowing owls (Athene cunicularia), sea turtles, gopher tortoises (Gopherus polyphemus), and gopher frogs (Lithobates capito). They are opportunistic eaters that prey on a variety of crustaceans, fish, lizards, small mammals, and human garbage. Several native egg-laying species such as brown pelicans (Pelecanus occidentalis), American crocodiles (Crocodylus acutus), and diamondback terrapins (Malaclemys terrapin) are particularly at risk for predation by Nile monitors. | | |
| Argentine black and white tegu | Argentine tegu | Argentine / 2013 | Imported by/through pet trade |

=== Birds ===
| Scientific name | Common name(s) | Origin / Year(s) introduced | Method of introduction |
|---|---|---|---|
| Myiopsitta monachus | Monk parakeet, Quaker parrot | South America / Established by 1969 | Imported by/through pet trade |
| Myiopsitta monachus | Between 1968 and 1972, more than 64,000 monk parakeets were brought to the U.S. They are considered agricultural pests in South America and killed by the thousands. They are included in invasive species lists in Florida for their abilities to rapidly populate an area for an apparent consistent amount of time. They live in large colonies numbering in the hundreds. They are urban pests because their large communal nests form balls of twigs on power lines. | | |
| Cairina moschata | Muscovy duck | South or Central America / 1960s | Imported by/through pet trade |
| Cairina moschata | The Muscovy duck was first introduced in the 1960s. It was initially introduced in the wild by purposeful release and escape from pet owners. They are native to South, Central, and some parts of North America, but not Florida. In the wild, the duck will eat seeds, insects, plants, grasses, and aquatic plants. They are aggressive and tend to breed around farms or lakes. The duck has white and red colored feathers. They are known to spread diseases to native species and breed with native birds. Due to this, it is illegal to release the bird in the state or Florida. | | |

=== Mammals ===
| Scientific name | Common name(s) | Origin / Year(s) introduced | Method of introduction |
|---|---|---|---|
| Sus scrofa | Wild boar, feral pig | Europe / Introduced with European settlers in the 16th century | Food for people |
| Sus scrofa | Wild pigs are voracious opportunistic eaters, consuming significant amounts of native vegetation, and they prey on smaller animals. They carry 45 infectious diseases or parasites, such as pseudorabies, eastern equine encephalitis, and brucellosis, which can be spread to other mammals. They have spread trichinosis to the critically endangered Florida panther (Puma concolor coryi). They in turn serve as food for panthers, alligators, and Florida black bears (Ursus americanus floridanus). | | |
| Felis catus | Domestic / feral cat | North Africa and Southern Europe / Introduced with European settlers in the 16th century | Companions for people |
| Felis catus | Domesticated free-ranging and feral cats are the primary cause of bird deaths in the U.S. Although cats may be regularly fed, they have an instinct to hunt and are responsible for decreasing numbers of beach mice (Peromyscus polionotus), cotton mice (Peromyscus gossypinus), the endangered Lower Keys marsh rabbit (Sylvilagus palustris hefneri), the Florida scrub jay (Aphelocoma coerulescens), ground-nesting birds and sea turtle hatchlings. They may carry diseases that can be spread to bobcats and the Florida panther, including feline leukemia, feline panleukopenia, and rabies. Cats reproduce prodigiously; there are an estimated 5.3 million free-ranging cats in Florida. Most live in feral colonies or are closely associated with residential areas. In similar sized territories, cats potentially outnumber bobcats 640:1. Authorities address feral cats by urging pet owners to keep cats indoors, or trapping-neutering-and returning (TNR) them to their territories to live out their lives and die naturally. | | |
| Rattus rattus | Black rat, roof rat, house rat, ship rat | Europe / Introduced with European settlers in the 16th century | Inhabitants of settlers' ships |
| Rattus rattus | Black rats were possibly the first introduced mammals to Florida, followed by pigs. There are a few feral rat species in South Florida, including brown rats (Rattus norvegicus), but black rats are considerably more populous than any other species of rat. All exotic rats compete with native mice and rodents for food and shelter, but the black rat is noted for significantly affecting the endangered Key Largo woodrat (Neotoma floridana smalli). | | |

== See also ==
- Burmese pythons in Florida
- Invasive species in the United States
- List of invasive marine fish in Florida
- List of invasive plant species in Florida
- List of invasive species in Florida
