= Tillandsia polita =

Scientific classification
- Kingdom: Plantae
- Clade: Tracheophytes
- Clade: Angiosperms
- Clade: Monocots
- Clade: Commelinids
- Order: Poales
- Family: Bromeliaceae
- Genus: Tillandsia
- Subgenus: Tillandsia subg. Tillandsia
- Species: T. polita

Binomial name
- Tillandsia polita L.B.Sm.

Synonyms
- Tillandsia polita var. elongata Ehlers; Tillandsia vicentina var. glabra L.B.Sm.

Species of plant

Tillandsia polita is a species of flowering plant in the family Bromeliaceae, native to Mexico and Central America (El Salvador, Guatemala and Honduras). It was first described by Lyman Bradford Smith in 1941. As of October 2022, the Encyclopaedia of Bromeliads regarded it as a natural hybrid of Tillandsia rodrigueziana and Tillandsia rotundata.
