= List of Metamasius species =

This is a list of 122 species in the genus Metamasius, bromeliad weevils.

== Metamasius species ==
- Metamasius alterans Hustache, 1936^{c}
- Metamasius alveolus Vaurie, 1968^{c}
- Metamasius ambiguus Csiki, E., 1936^{c}
- Metamasius amplicollis Hustache, 1936^{c}
- Metamasius annulatus Vaurie, 1967^{c}
- Metamasius applicatus Hustache, 1938^{c}
- Metamasius atwoodi Anderson, 2002^{i g}
- Metamasius aurocinctus Vaurie, 1967^{c}
- Metamasius barbatulus Vaurie, 1968^{c}
- Metamasius basilaris Vaurie, 1967^{c}
- Metamasius bellorum Anderson, 2002^{i g}
- Metamasius benoisti Hustache, 1936^{c}
- Metamasius bigeminatus Champion, 1910^{c}
- Metamasius biguttatus Champion, 1910^{c}
- Metamasius bilobus Hustache, 1936^{c}
- Metamasius bisignatus Hustache, 1932^{c}
- Metamasius bolivari Vaurie, 1967^{c}
- Metamasius brevinasus Hustache, 1936^{c}
- Metamasius bromeliadicola Champion, 1913^{c}
- Metamasius bruneri Buchanan, 1942^{c}
- Metamasius burcheri Anderson, 2002^{i g}
- Metamasius callizona Champion, G.C., 1910^{c b} (Mexican bromeliad weevil)
- Metamasius carbonarius Champion, G.C., 1910^{c}
- Metamasius carinipyga Vaurie, 1967^{c}
- Metamasius cerasinus Vaurie, 1967^{c}
- Metamasius ciliatus Vaurie, 1967^{c}
- Metamasius cincinnatus Champion, 1910^{c}
- Metamasius cinnamomeus Gemminger, M. & Harold, E. von q., 1871^{c}
- Metamasius cinnamominus Champion, G.C., 1910^{c}
- Metamasius circumdatus Vaurie, 1967^{c}
- Metamasius circumjectus Vaurie, 1967^{c}
- Metamasius condylus Vaurie, 1967^{c}
- Metamasius conicicollis Hustache, 1936^{c}
- Metamasius connexus Champion, 1910^{c}
- Metamasius consimilis Voss, 1954^{c}
- Metamasius consularis Günther, 1941^{c}
- Metamasius crinitus Vaurie, 1971^{c}
- Metamasius crustosus Vaurie, 1967^{c}
- Metamasius dasycnemis Günther, 1936^{c}
- Metamasius dasyurus Champion, 1910^{c}
- Metamasius decoratus Csiki, E., 1936^{c}
- Metamasius dentirostris Hustache, 1936^{c}
- Metamasius difficilis Günther, 1941^{c}
- Metamasius dimidiatipennis Champion, G.C., 1910^{c}
- Metamasius dimidiatus Csiki, E., 1936^{c}
- Metamasius dispar Gyllenhal, L. in Schönherr, C.J., 1838^{c}
- Metamasius distorta Günther, 1941^{c}
- Metamasius duplocinctus Vaurie, 1967^{c}
- Metamasius elegantulus Hustache, 1936^{c}
- Metamasius ensirostris Champion, G.C., 1910^{c}
- Metamasius fasciatus Champion, G.C., 1910^{c}
- Metamasius foveolatus Vaurie, 1967^{c}
- Metamasius fractelineatus Hustache, 1936^{c}
- Metamasius gallettae Anderson, 2002^{i g}
- Metamasius graphipterus Vaurie, 1967^{c}
- Metamasius guentheri Vaurie, 1967^{c}
- Metamasius hebetatus Champion, 1910^{c}
- Metamasius hemipterus Champion, G.C., 1910^{c b} (silky cane weevil)
- Metamasius hooveri Anderson, 2002^{i g}
- Metamasius hoppi Voss, 1954^{c}
- Metamasius illusionis Vaurie, 1968^{c}
- Metamasius imitator Vaurie, 1967^{c}
- Metamasius incisus Vaurie, 1967^{c}
- Metamasius inscriptus Csiki, E., 1936^{c}
- Metamasius laticrus Vaurie, 1967^{c}
- Metamasius leopardinus Anderson, 2002^{i g}
- Metamasius limulus Vaurie, 1967^{c}
- Metamasius lyratus Günther, 1941^{c}
- Metamasius maculiventris Champion, 1910^{c}
- Metamasius melancholicus Champion, G.C., 1910^{c}
- Metamasius mesomelas Vaurie, 1967^{c}
- Metamasius monilis Vaurie, 1967^{c}
- Metamasius mosieri Barber, 1920^{i c b}
- Metamasius murdiei Anderson, 2002^{i g}
- Metamasius nigerrimus Csiki, E., 1936^{c}
- Metamasius nigromaculatus Voss, 1954^{c}
- Metamasius nudiventris Champion, 1910^{c}
- Metamasius obsoletus Champion, G.C., 1936^{c}
- Metamasius ochreofasciatus Champion, 1910^{c}
- Metamasius octonotatus Champion, 1910^{c}
- Metamasius ornatus Vaurie, 1967^{c}
- Metamasius pallisteri Vaurie, 1967^{c}
- Metamasius personatus Vaurie, 1967^{c}
- Metamasius peruanus Hustache, 1936^{c}
- Metamasius planatus Anderson, 2013^{c g}
- Metamasius polygrammus Champion, G.C., 1910^{c}
- Metamasius pruinosus Vaurie, 1967^{c}
- Metamasius puncticeps Hustache, 1936^{c}
- Metamasius purpurascens (Panzer, G.W.F., 1798)^{c g}
- Metamasius pygidialis Günther, 1935^{c}
- Metamasius quadrilineatus Champion, 1910^{c}
- Metamasius quadrisignatus Csiki, E., 1936^{c}
- Metamasius rectistriatus Vaurie, 1967^{c}
- Metamasius richdeboeri Anderson, 2002^{i g}
- Metamasius rimoratus Csiki, E., 1936^{c}
- Metamasius ritchiei Marshall, 1916^{c}
- Metamasius rubetra (Olivier, 1790)^{g}
- Metamasius rufofasciatus Csiki, E., 1936^{c}
- Metamasius sacchari Csiki, E., 1936^{c}
- Metamasius saecularis Janczyk, 1976^{c}
- Metamasius scutatus Champion, 1910^{c}
- Metamasius scutellatus Hustache, 1936^{c}
- Metamasius scutiger Champion, 1910^{c}
- Metamasius sellatus Champion, 1910^{c}
- Metamasius semirubripes Hustache, 1936^{c}
- Metamasius sericeus Kuschel, 1956^{c}
- Metamasius shchepaneki Anderson, 2002^{i g}
- Metamasius signiventris Kirsch, T., 1888-89^{c}
- Metamasius sinuatus Vaurie, 1967^{c}
- Metamasius spinolae (Gyllenhal, 1838)^{i}
- Metamasius spurius Vaurie, 1967^{c}
- Metamasius submaculatus Champion, G.C., 1910^{c}
- Metamasius sulcirostris Champion, 1910^{c}
- Metamasius tectus Vaurie, 1967^{c}
- Metamasius touroulti Rheinheimer, 2015^{g}
- Metamasius tuberculipectus Hustache, 1936^{c}
- Metamasius variegatus Csiki, E., 1936^{c}
- Metamasius vaurieae Anderson, 2002^{i g}
- Metamasius vicarius Vaurie, 1967^{c}
- Metamasius vicinus Hustache, 1936^{c}
- Metamasius wolfensohni Anderson, 2002^{i g}
- Metamasius yunquensis Vaurie, 1967^{c}

Data sources: i = ITIS, c = Catalogue of Life, g = GBIF, b = Bugguide.net
