= Clerarcha poliochyta =

Scientific classification
- Domain: Eukaryota
- Kingdom: Animalia
- Phylum: Arthropoda
- Class: Insecta
- Order: Lepidoptera
- Family: Xyloryctidae
- Genus: Clerarcha
- Species: C. poliochyta

Binomial name
- Clerarcha poliochyta Turner, 1902

Species of moth

Clerarcha poliochyta is a moth in the family Xyloryctidae. It was described by Alfred Jefferis Turner in 1902. It is found in Australia, where it has been recorded from the Northern Territory and Queensland.

The wingspan is 20–28 mm. The forewings are pale grey, mixed with white and dark fuscous and with a short narrow vertical dark fuscous line from the fold in the disc at one-third. There is a dark fuscous discal dot surrounded by white at two-thirds and a subterminal series of dark fuscous streaks on the veins, as well as a series of minute terminal dark fuscous dots, obsolete towards the costa. The hindwings are grey.

The larvae feed on Melaleuca quinquenervia.
