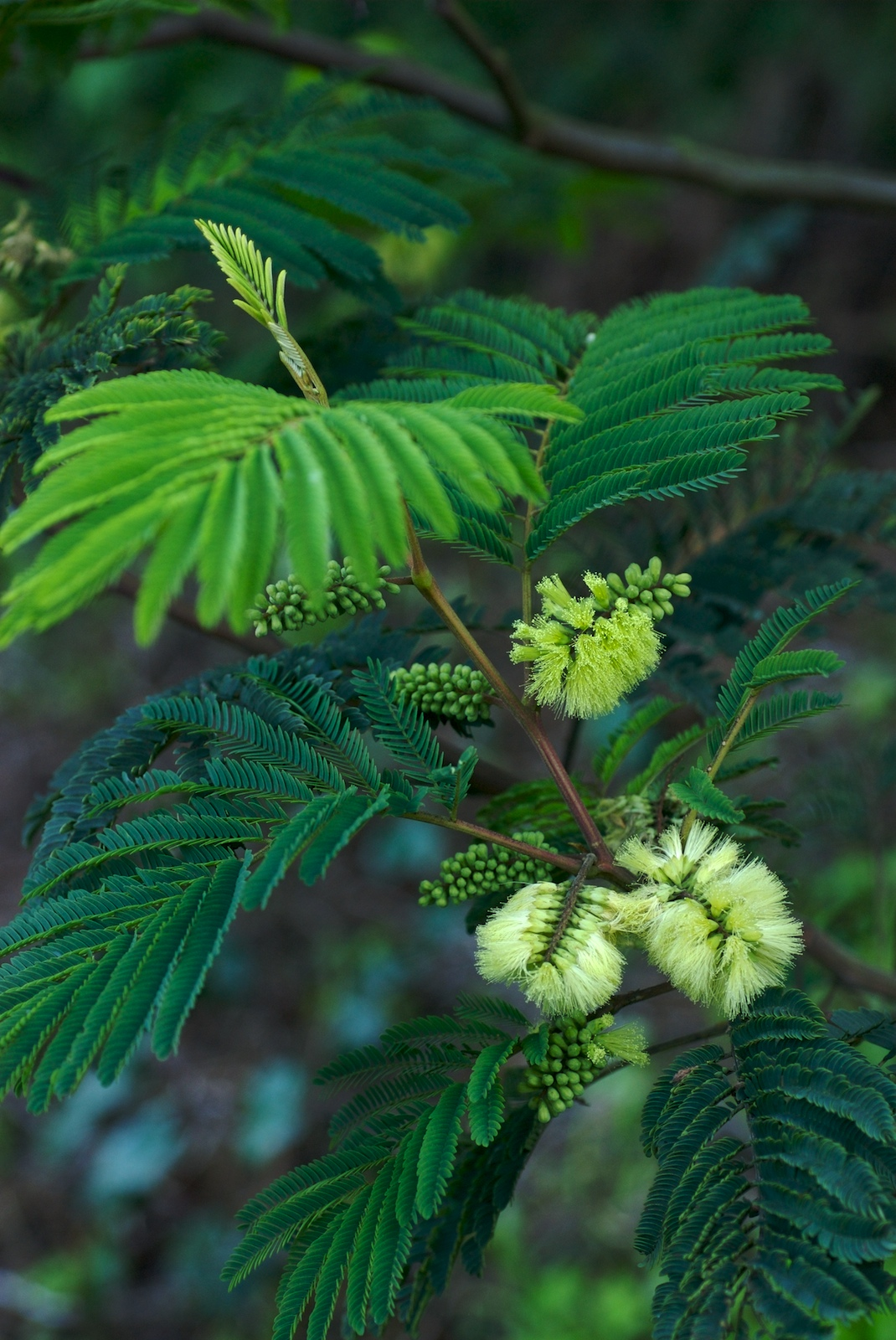

Scientific classification
- Kingdom: Plantae
- Clade: Embryophytes
- Clade: Tracheophytes
- Clade: Angiosperms
- Clade: Eudicots
- Clade: Rosids
- Order: Fabales
- Family: Fabaceae
- Subfamily: Caesalpinioideae
- Clade: Mimosoid clade
- Genus: Paraserianthes; I.C.Nielsen (1983)
- Species: P. lophantha

Binomial name
- Paraserianthes lophantha (Willd.) I.C.Nielsen (1983)

Synonyms
- Acacia lophantha (Vent.) Willd. (1806); Albizia distachya (Vent.) J.F.Macbr. (1919); Albizia lophantha (Vent.) Benth. (1844); Feuilleea distachya (Vent.) Kuntze (1891); Mimosa distachya Vent. (1800), nom. illeg.; Mimosa lophantha Vent. (1800); Sericandra lophantha (Vent.) Raf. (1838)

= Paraserianthes =

Species of legume

Paraserianthes lophantha (syn. Albizia lophantha), the Cape Leeuwin wattle, Bicol wattle, Cape wattle, Crested wattle, Brush wattle or plume albizia, is a fast-growing tree with creamy-yellow, bottlebrush like flowers. It is the sole species in genus Paraserianthes.

It is a small tree (uppermost height approximately 5 metres or 16 feet) that occurs naturally along the southwest coast of Western Australia, from Fremantle to King George Sound. It is also native to Sumatra, Java, and the Lesser Sunda Islands. It was first spread beyond southwest Australia by Baron Ferdinand von Mueller, who gave packets of P. lophantha seeds to early explorers under the assumption that if they planted the seeds at their campsites, the trees would indicate the routes they travelled.

It is considered a weed in the parts of Australia where it is not indigenous, as well as in New Zealand, South Africa, the Canary Islands, the Philippines and Chile.

== Taxonomy ==
It was first described in 1806 as Acacia lophantha by Willdenow, but was transferred to the genus Paraserianthes by Nielsen, Guinet and Baretta-Kuipers in 1983.

The genus Paraserianthes originally comprised four species, divided into two sections based on morphological traits by Nielsen. Section Paraserianthes included P. lophantha with two recognized subspecies, and section Falcataria included three species (P. falcataria, P. pullenii, and P. toona).

Based on morphology, P. falcataria (L.) I.C.Nielsen was moved to the genus Falcataria by Barneby and Grimes, and renamed Falcataria moluccana (Miq.) Barneby & J.W.Grimes. Brown et al. used biogeographical, morphological and molecular studies to completely separate of these sections into two genera as Paraserianthes sensu Nielsen was paraphyletic. Now P. pullenii (Verdc.) I.C. Nielsen = Falcataria pullenii (Verdc.) G.K. Brown, D.J. Murphy & P.Y. Ladiges; and P. toona (F.M. Bailey) I.C. Nielsen = Falcataria toona (Bailey), G.K. Brown, D.J. Murphy & P.Y. Ladiges. Paraserianthes section remained in the genus with only P. lophantha.

=== Subspecies ===
Paraserianthes lophantha includes two subspecies:

- P. lophantha subsp. lophantha in southwestern Australia
- P. lophantha subsp. montana (Jungh.) I.C. Nielsen in high elevation sites in Western Indonesia (Sumatara, Java and Western Nusa Tenggara Province).

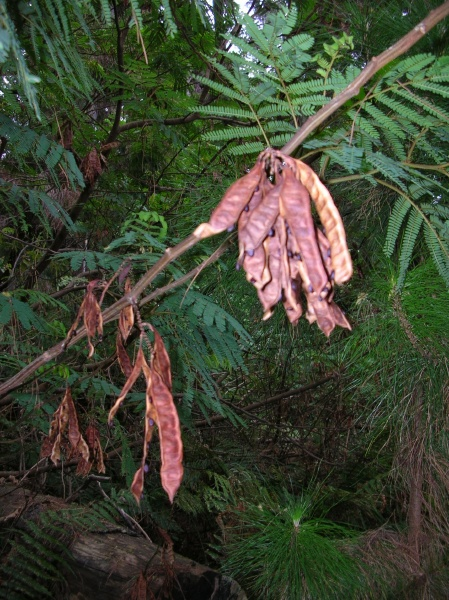
Seed pods

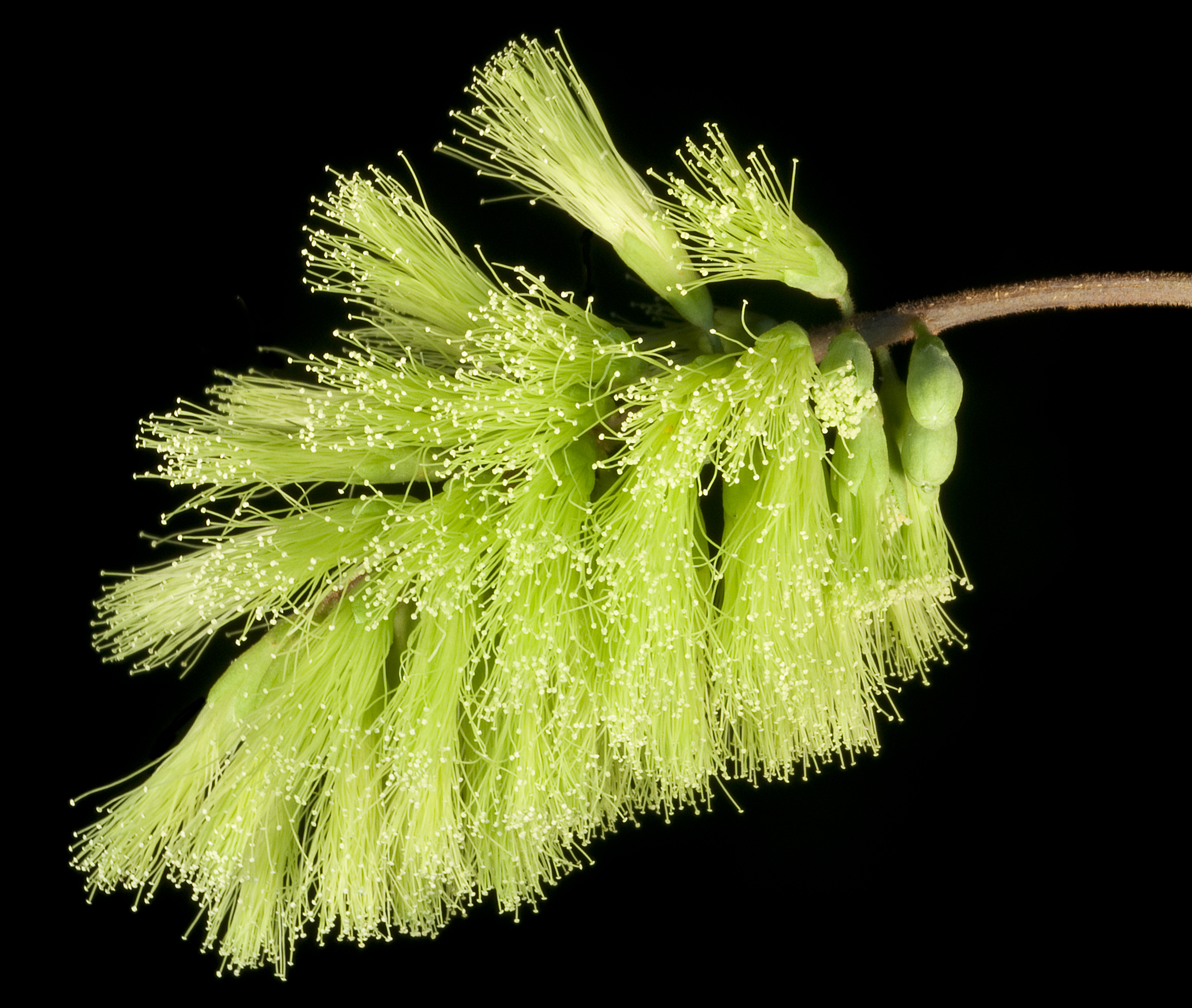
Inflorescence

== See also ==
- Invasive species in Australia
- Invasive plants of Australian origin
