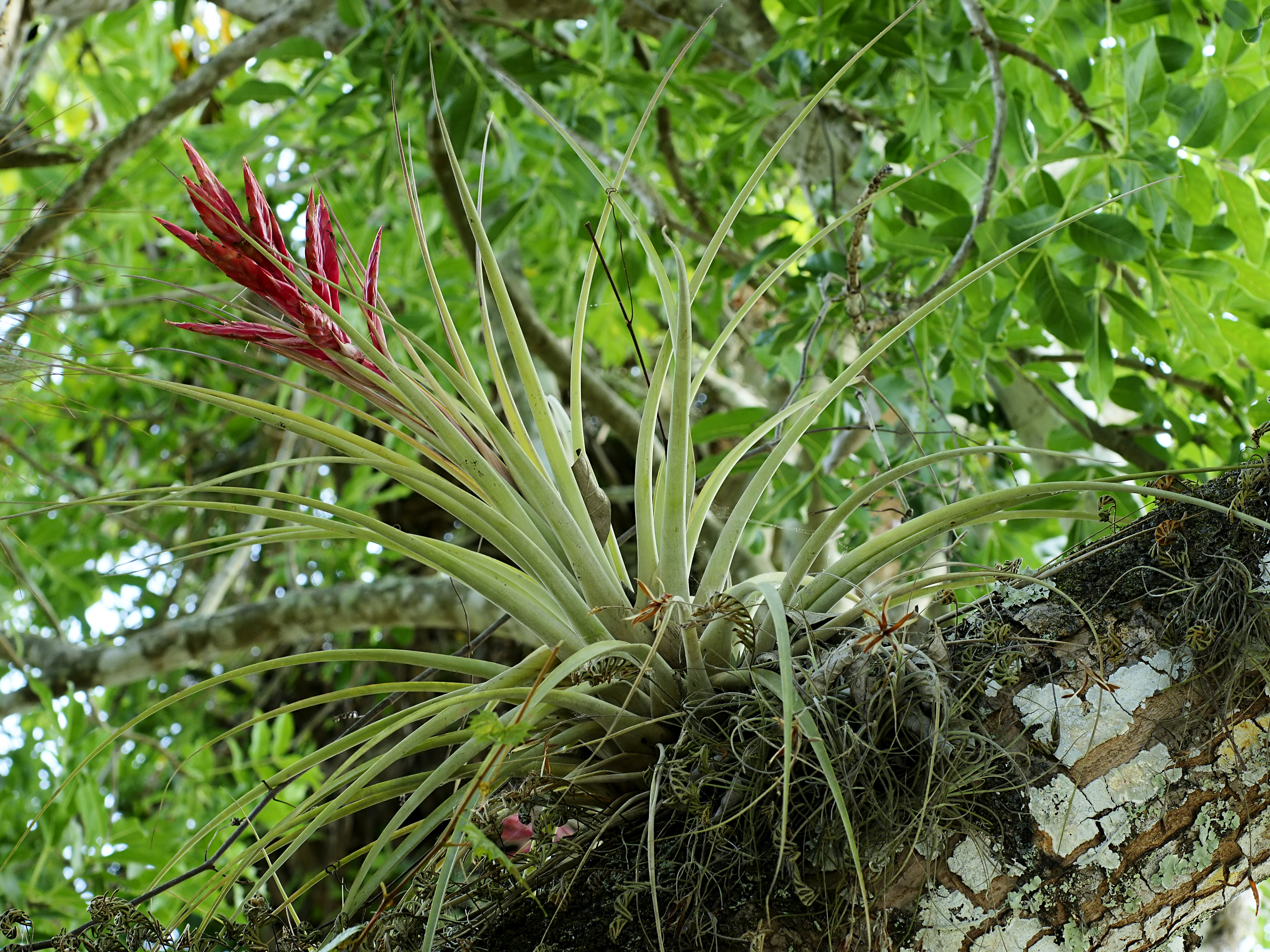

Conservation status
- Least Concern (IUCN 3.1)

Scientific classification
- Kingdom: Plantae
- Clade: Tracheophytes
- Clade: Angiosperms
- Clade: Monocots
- Clade: Commelinids
- Order: Poales
- Family: Bromeliaceae
- Genus: Tillandsia
- Subgenus: Tillandsia subg. Tillandsia
- Species: T. fasciculata

Binomial name
- Tillandsia fasciculata Sw.

Synonyms
- Tillandsia eminens Lindl.; Vriesea glaucophylla Hook.; Platystachys glaucophylla (Hook.) Beer; Platystachys havanensis Beer; Tillandsia havanensis Beer; Tillandsia macrostachya Klotzsch ex Beer; Tillandsia pungens Mez; Tillandsia beutelspacheri Matuda ex L.B.Sm.; Tillandsia wilsonii S.Watson; Tillandsia hystricina Small

= Tillandsia fasciculata =

Species of flowering plant

Tillandsia fasciculata, commonly known as the giant airplant, giant wild pine, or cardinal airplant, is a species of bromeliad that is native to Central America, Mexico, the West Indies, northern South America (Venezuela, Colombia, Suriname, French Guiana, northern Brazil), and the southeastern United States (Georgia and Florida). Within the United States, this airplant is at risk of extirpation from the Mexican bromeliad weevil, Metamasius callizona. A related plant, Tillandsia utriculata, sometimes called the "wild pine", is endemic to the same areas.

== Varieties and cultivars ==
Four varieties are recognized:

1. Tillandsia fasciculata var. clavispica Mez – Florida, Cuba, southern Mexico, Cayman Islands
2. Tillandsia fasciculata var. densispica Mez – Florida, southern and eastern Mexico, Guatemala, Costa Rica, Hispaniola
3. Tillandsia fasciculata var. fasciculata – most of species range
4. Tillandsia fasciculata var. laxispica Mez – central Mexico, Jamaica, Hispaniola, Cuba

Several cultivars have been named:

- Tillandsia 'Beauty'
- Tillandsia 'Casallena'
- Tillandsia 'Cathcart'
- Tillandsia 'Chevalieri'
- Tillandsia 'Chiquininga'
- Tillandsia 'Ervin Wurthmann'
- Tillandsia 'Florida'
- Tillandsia 'Hines Poth'
- Tillandsia 'Jalapa Fortin'
- Tillandsia 'Latas au Pair'
- Tillandsia 'Maria Teresa L.'
- Tillandsia 'Miz Ellen'
- Tillandsia 'Neerdie'
- Tillandsia 'Pachuca'
- Tillandsia 'Silver Bullets'
- Tillandsia 'Summer Dawn'
- Tillandsia 'Sybil Frasier'
- Tillandsia 'Tropiflora'
- Tillandsia 'Unamit'
- Tillandsia 'Verraco'
- Tillandsia 'Veteran'
