= Clerarcha dryinopa =

Scientific classification
- Domain: Eukaryota
- Kingdom: Animalia
- Phylum: Arthropoda
- Class: Insecta
- Order: Lepidoptera
- Family: Xyloryctidae
- Genus: Clerarcha
- Species: C. dryinopa

Binomial name
- Clerarcha dryinopa Meyrick, 1890

Species of moth

Clerarcha dryinopa is a moth in the family Xyloryctidae. It was described by Edward Meyrick in 1890. It is found in Australia, where it has been recorded from the Australian Capital Territory, New South Wales and Victoria.

== Classification ==
The wingspan is about 24 mm. The forewings are white, irregularly irrorated (sprinkled) with light ochreous and with light brownish-ochreous markings, irregularly irrorated with dark fuscous. There is a moderate cloudy streak from the base beneath the costa to the apex. A rather broad streak is found along the inner margin from near the base to the anal angle, confluent with a small spot on the submedian fold before the middle. There is an irregular cloudy transverse streak from before two-thirds of the costa to the anal angle. A broader cloudy transverse streak, is angulated outwards above the middle, from three-fourths of the costa to the anal angle, where it coalesces with the preceding. There is also a cloudy streak around the apex and along the hindmargin. The hindwings are fuscous whitish, the terminal third suffused with fuscous, darker posteriorly.
