= Metamasius mosieri =

Scientific classification
- Domain: Eukaryota
- Kingdom: Animalia
- Phylum: Arthropoda
- Class: Insecta
- Order: Coleoptera
- Suborder: Polyphaga
- Infraorder: Cucujiformia
- Family: Curculionidae
- Genus: Metamasius
- Species: M. mosieri

Binomial name
- Metamasius mosieri Barber, 1920

Species of beetle

Metamasius mosieri is a species of beetle in the family Dryophthoridae. It is found in North America.
