= Clerarcha =

Scientific classification
- Kingdom: Animalia
- Phylum: Arthropoda
- Class: Insecta
- Order: Lepidoptera
- Family: Xyloryctidae
- Genus: Clerarcha; Meyrick, 1890

Genus of moths

Clerarcha is a genus of moths of the family Xyloryctidae.

== Species ==
- Clerarcha agana Meyrick, 1890
- Clerarcha dryinopa Meyrick, 1890
- Clerarcha grammatistis Meyrick, 1890
- Clerarcha poliochyta Turner, 1902
