= Clerarcha agana =

Scientific classification
- Domain: Eukaryota
- Kingdom: Animalia
- Phylum: Arthropoda
- Class: Insecta
- Order: Lepidoptera
- Family: Xyloryctidae
- Genus: Clerarcha
- Species: C. agana

Binomial name
- Clerarcha agana Meyrick, 1890

Species of moth

Clerarcha agana is a moth in the family Xyloryctidae. It was described by Edward Meyrick in 1890. It is found in Australia, where it has been recorded from South Australia and Western Australia.

The wingspan is 15–18 mm. The forewings are white, irrorated (sprinkled) with dark ochreous grey, the dorsal half suffused with pale grey and with four small roundish cloudy rather dark grey spots, the first three arranged in a longitudinal row in the disc at one-third, one-half, and two-thirds, the fourth directly beneath the third. The hindwings are pale whitish grey.

The larvae feed on the flower spike of Banksia marginata.
