= Clerarcha grammatistis =

Scientific classification
- Domain: Eukaryota
- Kingdom: Animalia
- Phylum: Arthropoda
- Class: Insecta
- Order: Lepidoptera
- Family: Xyloryctidae
- Genus: Clerarcha
- Species: C. grammatistis

Binomial name
- Clerarcha grammatistis Meyrick, 1890

Synonyms
- Procometis vepallida Turner, 1917

Species of moth

Clerarcha grammatistis is a moth in the family Xyloryctidae. It was described by Edward Meyrick in 1890. It is found in Australia, where it has been recorded from Western Australia.

The wingspan is 21–26 mm. The forewings are ochreous grey, irregularly and suffusedly irrorated (sprinkled) with white and with a black longitudinal dash beneath the costa near the base, as well as a small white spot in the disc at two-fifths, followed and often preceded by small suffused spots of black scales, and a small blackish suffused spot on the fold rather obliquely before this. There is a small transverse whitish spot in the disc at two-thirds, posteriorly suffusedly margined with black, and followed by some scattered black scales. There is also an indistinct cloudy whitish line from the costa beyond the middle very obliquely outwards to near the apex, then sharply angulated, and continued to the anal angle. The hindwings are pale whitish fuscous.
