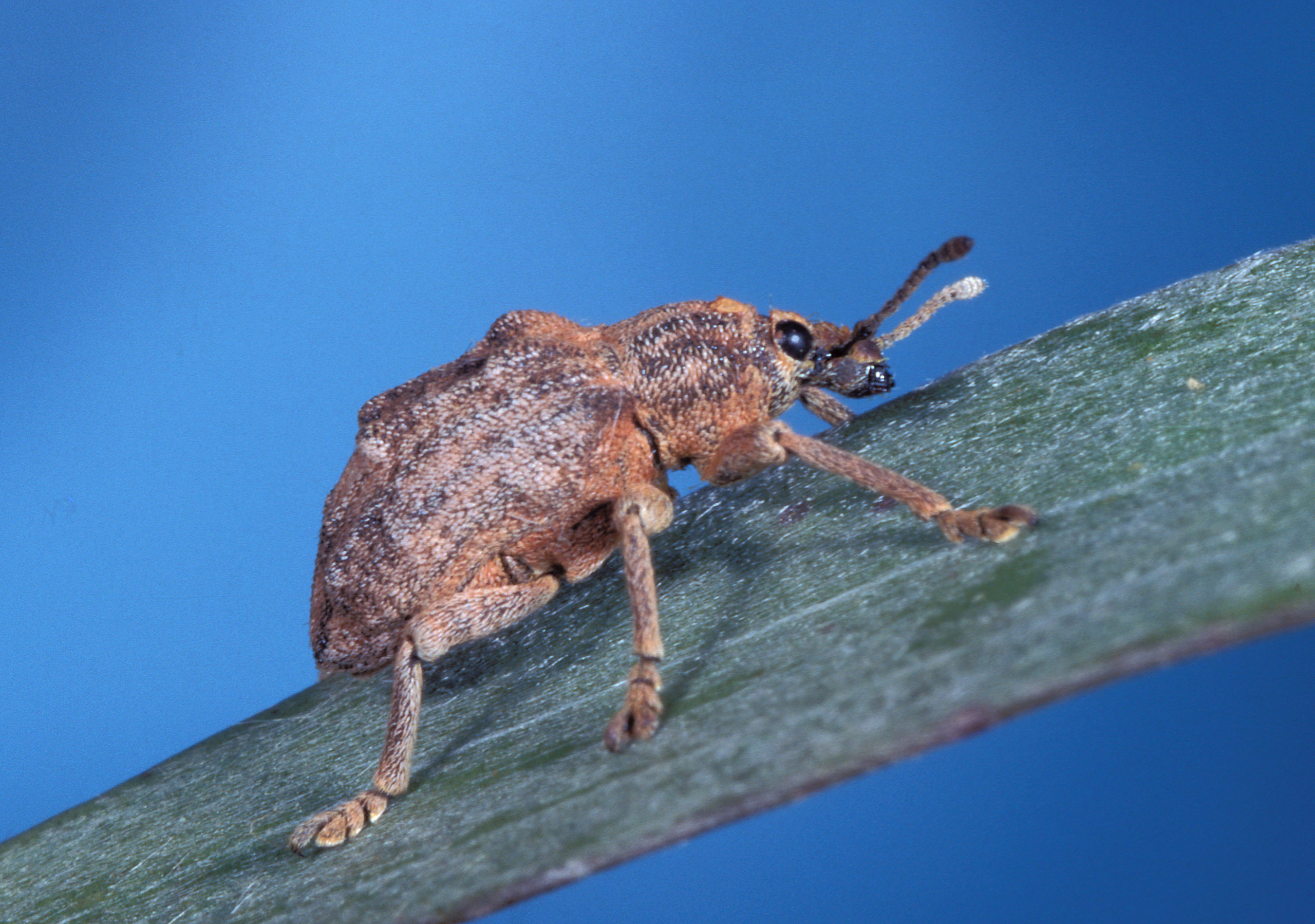

Scientific classification
- Kingdom: Animalia
- Phylum: Arthropoda
- Clade: Pancrustacea
- Class: Insecta
- Order: Coleoptera
- Suborder: Polyphaga
- Infraorder: Cucujiformia
- Superfamily: Curculionoidea
- Family: Curculionidae
- Genus: Oxyops
- Species: O. vitiosa

Binomial name
- Oxyops vitiosa Pascoe, 1870

= Oxyops vitiosa =

Species of beetle

Oxyops vitiosa is a species of weevil in the family Curculionidae. Common names include the melaleuca leaf weevil and the melaleuca snout beetle. It feeds on the leaves and shoots of the broad-leaved paper bark tree, Melaleuca quinquenervia, which is endemic to Australia where it grows on seasonally inundated plains and swampland, and was introduced into Florida in order to help drain flooded portions of the Everglades.

== Life cycle ==
Adult weevils are gray and six to nine millimetres long, the males being slightly smaller than the females. They are usually found on the leaves and twigs of saplings or the new growth of larger melaleuca trees but are inconspicuous and their presence is most noticeable from the holes they chew in the buds, leaves and stems.

After mating, the females lays eggs singly or in small groups on the tips of young leaves or sometimes on more mature leaves and new plant growth. The eggs are yellow and one millimetre long when laid but the female usually covers them in a protective secretion which dries to form a hard, dark coloured casing. Female weevils can live for up to ten months, during which time they may produce from 500 to 1000 eggs at the rate of up to nine eggs per day.

The eggs hatch in about a week and the larvae moult four times, eventually reaching about 1.4 millimetres long. They are yellow when newly hatched but later instars are gray and slug-like. As they develop they become covered with a translucent yellowish oily secretion which turns black as faecal material adheres to it. This coating may provide protection from fire ants and other predators. The larvae often trail a black faecal string behind them. When feeding, they eat through all the layers of the leaf except for the cuticle on the far side, leaving paper-thin trails across the leaf surface as wide as their bodies. They take about seven weeks to develop and migrate downwards as they mature.

The fourth instar is the puparium. The larva ceases to feed and crawls or falls to the ground and finds a suitable underground site in which to pupate. It develops a capsule about ten millimetres in diameter which becomes coated with soil that adheres to the oily surface coating. This stage lasts from two to six weeks but usually about four weeks. Various soil types support pupation but success rates may be higher where soils are sandy and well drained. Sites with saturated soils or permanently flooded areas did not support colonisation when the species was introduced in Florida in 1997.

== Host range ==
This weevil feeds on Melaleuca quinquenervia, a tree in the myrtle family native to Australia. Tests were conducted in Australia to see whether any other plants acted as hosts to the weevil. Fewer than seven individuals were found on non-host species compared with more than a thousand on melaleuca. In laboratory tests, melaleuca was the only plant on which it proved possible to raise adults. Before it was introduced into Florida the weevil was tested in quarantine on over one hundred species of plant growing locally including all the members of the Myrtaceae native to Florida. It was found that adults might sporadically feed on other plants but that the weevil did not reproduce on any other of the species tested.

== Use in biological control ==
The melaleuca tree, Melaleuca quinquenervia, was introduced into Florida as an ornamental and began to naturalize in about 1906. It was later planted extensively in order to help drain flooded portions of the Everglades. Here it flourished and is now considered to be an invasive species and a serious threat to the ecosystem. In Florida it has no host-specific natural enemies and the introduction of certain insect species from Australia to help control it is being investigated. USDA scientists imported four insect species into quarantine for evaluation. Of these, the melaleuca leaf weevil seems the most promising. Both adults and larvae were found to disrupt the plant's normal growth processes which may make the plants more susceptible to other control measures. At certain test sites where the weevil has been introduced experimentally, flowering of the melaleuca tree has been reduced by up to 90%. This scale of damage may help to minimise the numbers of seeds produced and thus the spread of this invasive tree.
