= Tillandsia rotundata =

Scientific classification
- Kingdom: Plantae
- Clade: Embryophytes
- Clade: Tracheophytes
- Clade: Spermatophytes
- Clade: Angiosperms
- Clade: Monocots
- Clade: Commelinids
- Order: Poales
- Family: Bromeliaceae
- Genus: Tillandsia
- Subgenus: Tillandsia subg. Tillandsia
- Species: T. rotundata

Binomial name
- Tillandsia rotundata (L.B.Sm.) C.S.Gardner

Synonyms
- Tillandsia fasciculata var. rotundata L.B.Sm.

Species of epiphyte

Tillandsia rotundata is a species of flowering plant in the family Bromeliaceae, native to Guatemala, Honduras and southeastern Mexico (Chiapas). It was first described by Lyman Bradford Smith in 1945 as the variety rotundata of Tillandsia fasciculata and raised to a full species by Cecelia Sue Gardner in 1984.
