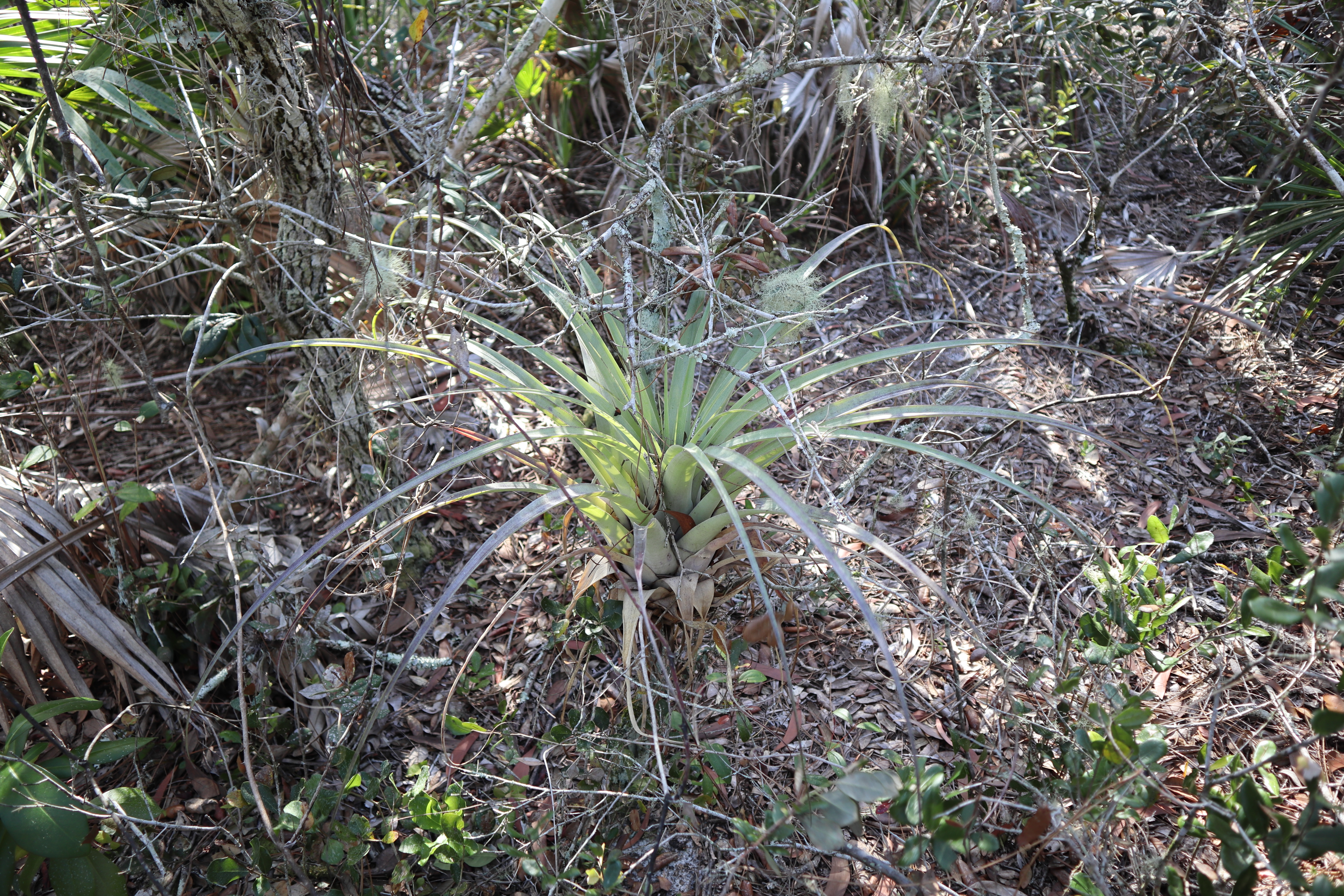

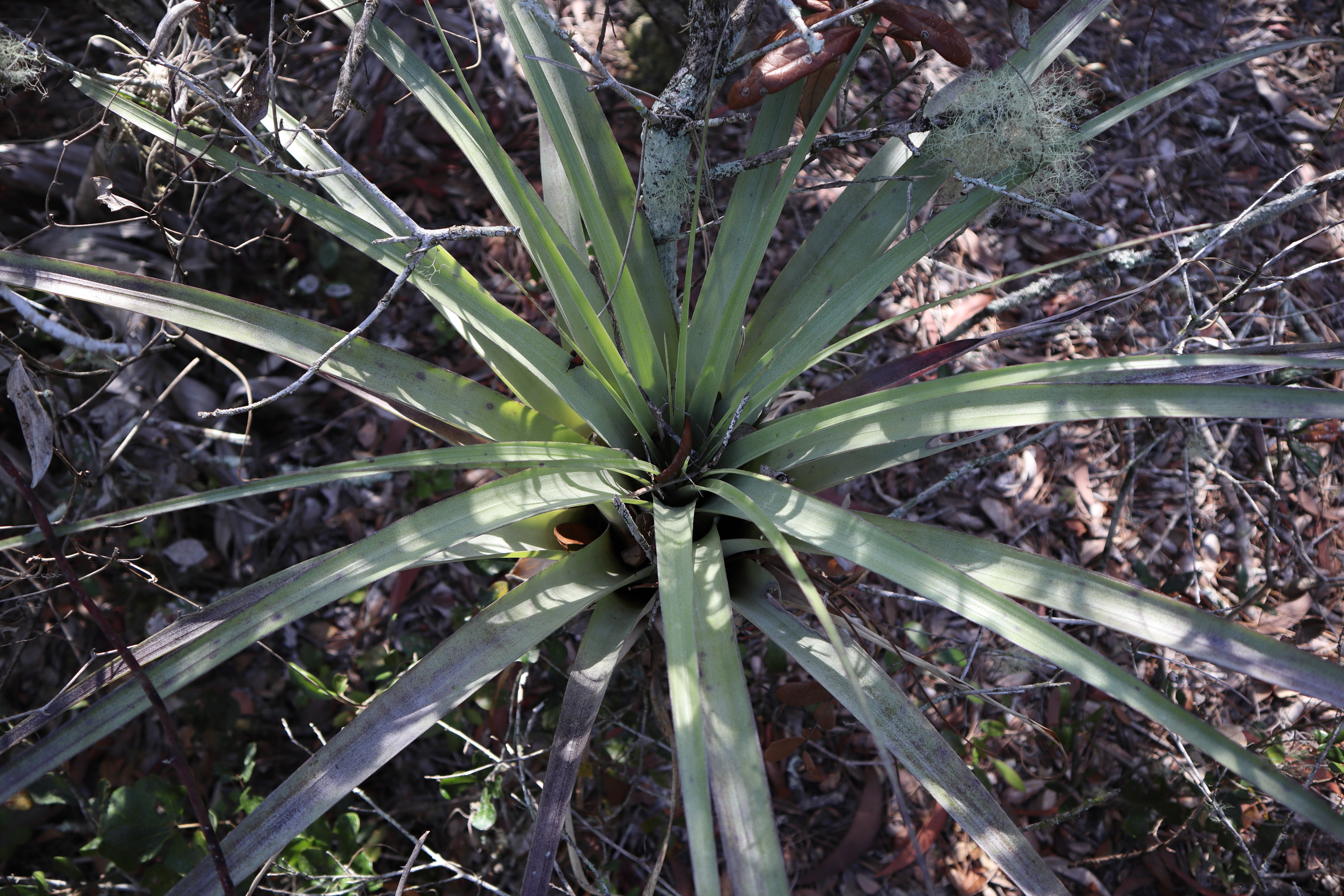
- T. utriculata tank

Conservation status
- Secure (NatureServe)

Scientific classification
- Kingdom: Plantae
- Clade: Embryophytes
- Clade: Tracheophytes
- Clade: Spermatophytes
- Clade: Angiosperms
- Clade: Monocots
- Clade: Commelinids
- Order: Poales
- Family: Bromeliaceae
- Genus: Tillandsia
- Subgenus: Tillandsia subg. Tillandsia
- Species: T. utriculata

Binomial name
- Tillandsia utriculata L.

Synonyms
- Platystachys utriculata (L.) Beer; Vriesea utriculata (L.) Regel; Tillandsia pringlei S.Watson; Tillandsia lingulata W.Bartram 1794, illegitimate homonym, not L. 1753; Tillandsia bartramii Nutt. 1822, illegitimate homonym, not Elliott 1817; Tillandsia nuttalliana Schult. & Schult.f.; Platystachys ehrenbergii K.Koch; Allardtia potockii Antoine; Tillandsia ramosa Bello; Platystachys ehrenbergiana K.Koch ex Hemsl.; Tillandsia ehrenbergiana Hemsl.; Tillandsia brevibracteata Baker; Tillandsia sintenisii Baker; Tillandsia ehrenbergii (K.Koch) Klotzsch ex Mez

= Tillandsia utriculata =

Species of flowering plant

Tillandsia utriculata, commonly known as the spreading airplant, the giant airplant, or wild pine is a species of bromeliad that is native to Florida and Georgia in the United States, the Caribbean, southern and eastern Mexico (Tamaulipas, Veracruz, Oaxaca, the Yucatán Peninsula), Central America, and Venezuela.

Two varieties are recognized:

1. Tillandsia utriculata subsp. pringlei (S.Watson) C.S.Gardner – eastern Mexico
2. Tillandsia utriculata subsp. utriculata – most of species range

Florida populations of Tillandsia utriculata are highly susceptible to attack by the invasive weevil Metamasius callizona, and have been devastated throughout their range. Tillandsia utriculata holds more impounded water in its leaf axils, known as its tank, (up to a liter) than does any other Florida bromeliad. It is a major host of many species of aquatic invertebrates. With T. utriculata on a steady decline, a loss of habitat is occurring for many of these animal species.
