= Invasive species of Australian origin =

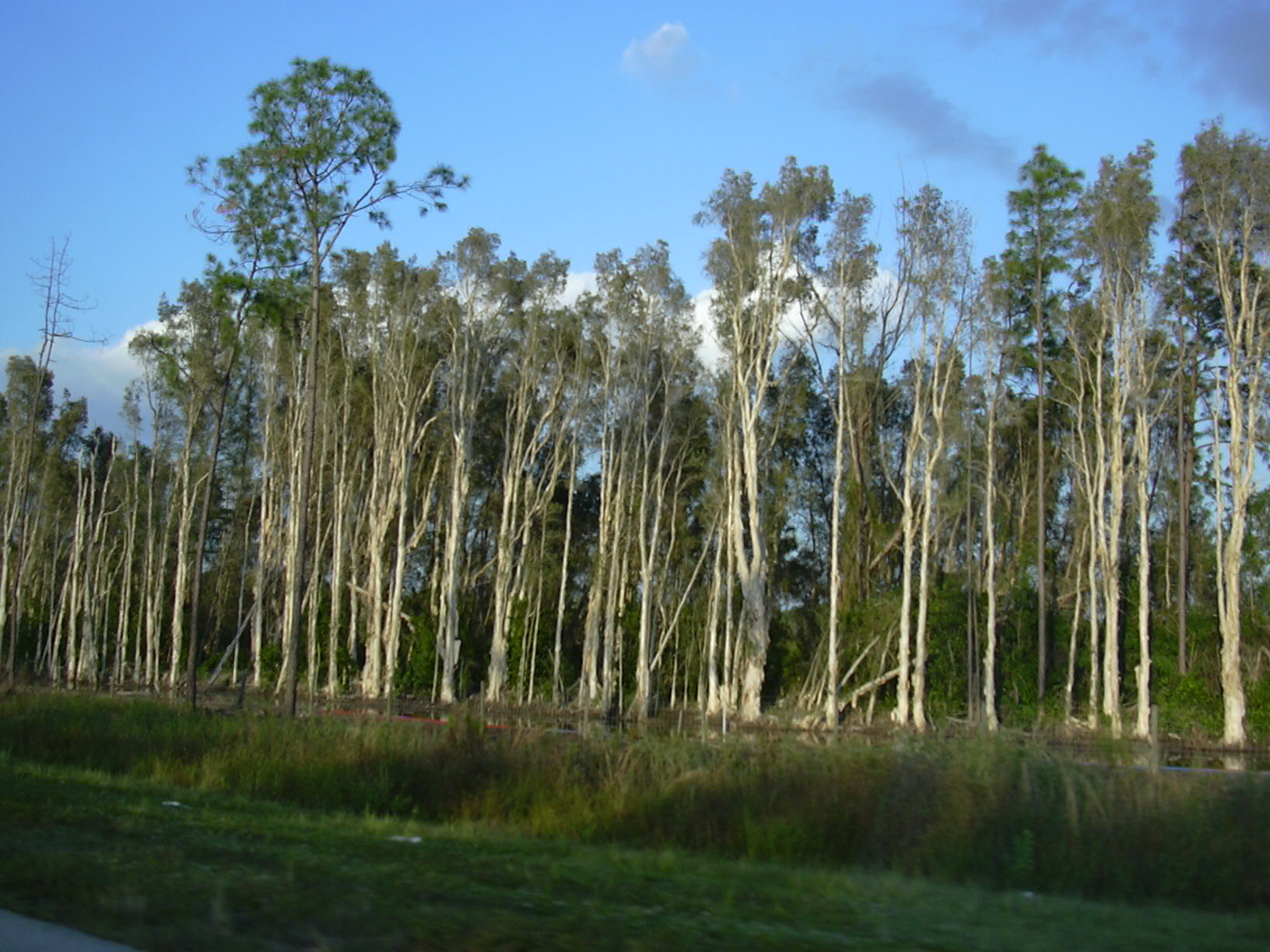
Melaleuca quinquenervia, commonly known in Australia as niaouli, broad-leaved paperbark or the paper bark tea tree, is an invasive species in the Florida Everglades.

There are a number of Australian species that have become invasive when introduced into outside Australia or outside Oceania.

== Animals ==
The Australian magpie has been introduced into New Zealand, where it is considered a pest because of its attacks on humans and a possible effect on the native bird population.

The common brushtail possum was introduced to New Zealand to start a fur industry, and spread nationwide. With no natural predators, these omnivores have had severe impacts on the native plants and animals they consume, including the eggs and chicks of nesting birds such as the kererū, tūī, and kākā. They are also a carrier of tuberculosis, which they can spread to livestock. Control of them has been an ongoing project of regional councils, the Department of Conservation, Forest and Bird, and various other wildlife preservation organizations.

The boatman fly (Pogonortalis doclea) is a dung-feeding platystomatid fly native to Australia that has become invasive in California.

== Plants ==
=== Melaleucas in the Everglades ===
Perhaps the best known example of an Australian plant becoming an invasive species is the problematic introduction of Melaleuca quinquenervia into Florida. As with all Melaleuca species, M. quinquenervia seeds prolifically. In the absence of natural predators, it spread throughout southern Florida; at one time it was estimated that it had colonised 12% of southern Florida. The colonised area included a substantial proportion of the Everglades, an important national park and World Heritage Site. Attempts were made to control the spread by burning, but this only exacerbated the problem as it encouraged seed dispersal while failing to kill the trees. The spread of Melaleuca is now managed by a combination of regular herbicide treatment and the introduction of an Australian beetle as a biological control.

=== Acacia in southern Africa ===
A number of Acacia species have become serious environmental pests after being introduced into southern Africa. The most troublesome species are Acacia cyclops and Acacia saligna. Both are Western Australian coastal wattles, introduced to help bind drifting sand dunes. They remain serious pests, but some controls have been introduced. In the case of Acacia saligna, the introduction of acacia seed weevils (Melanterius species) has achieved complete control. A lesser degree of control has been achieved for Acacia cyclops by the introduction of a gall rust fungus (Uromycladium species).

=== Other plant examples ===
- Acaena novae-zelandiae is declared a noxious weed in the American states of Hawaii, California and Oregon.
- Cupaniopsis anacardioides, the tuckeroo, has become an invasive weed along the coastline of Florida. The plant there is known as carrotwood.
- Eucalyptus globulus has spread rapidly as an invasive species since being introduced into California in the mid-19th century. Its colonization is reducing habitats for native species (often by type shift from grasslands or oak woodlands), and increasing the threats and spread of wildfires.
- Hakea sericea has colonised much of the Table Mountain fynbos since its introduction into South Africa.
- Imperata cylindrica
- Melia azedarach
- Pittosporum undulatum has become invasive in the Caribbean, Hawaii, southern Brazil and in the Azores.
- Heptapleurum actinophyllum
