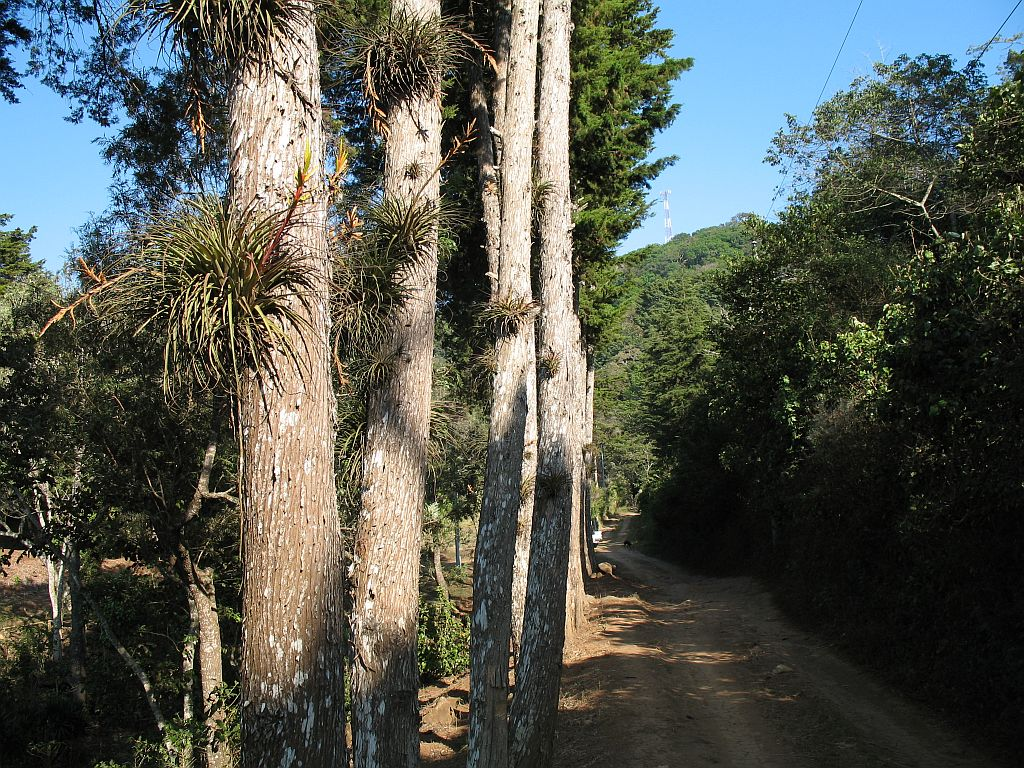

Scientific classification
- Kingdom: Plantae
- Clade: Embryophytes
- Clade: Tracheophytes
- Clade: Spermatophytes
- Clade: Angiosperms
- Clade: Monocots
- Clade: Commelinids
- Order: Poales
- Family: Bromeliaceae
- Genus: Tillandsia
- Subgenus: Tillandsia subg. Tillandsia
- Species: T. rodrigueziana

Binomial name
- Tillandsia rodrigueziana Mez

= Tillandsia rodrigueziana =

Species of epiphyte

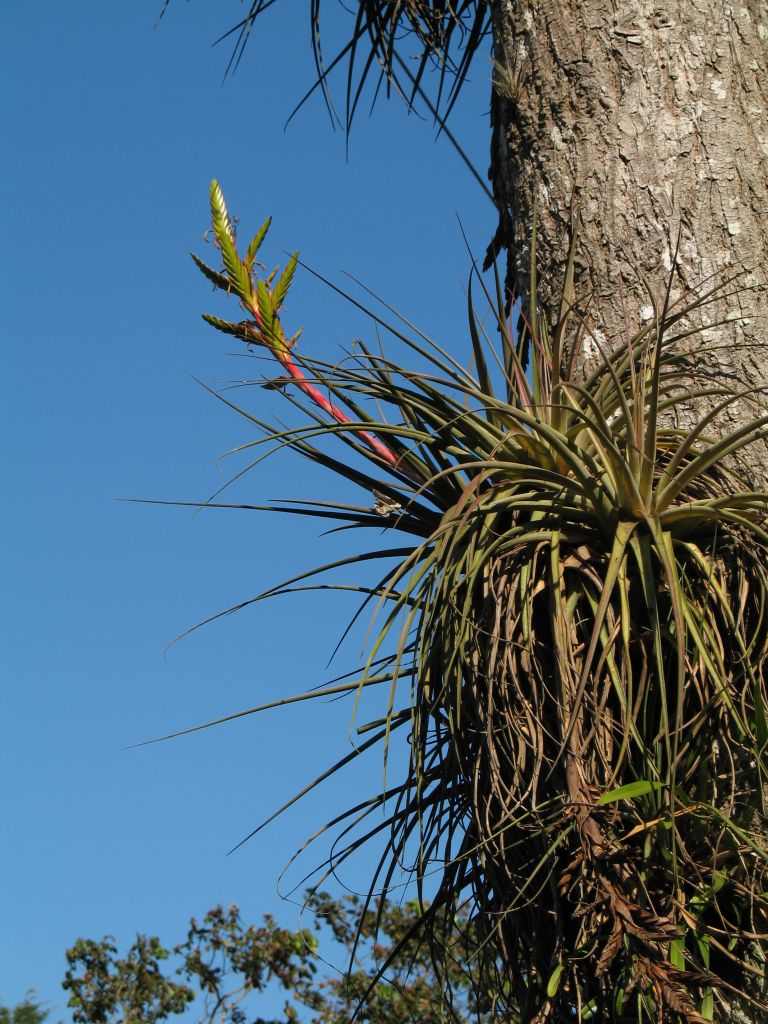

Tillandsia rodrigueziana is a species in the genus Tillandsia. This species is native to Mexico, El Salvador, Nicaragua, Guatemala, and Honduras.

== Cultivars ==
Recognized cultivars include:

- Tillandsia 'Tiki Torch'
