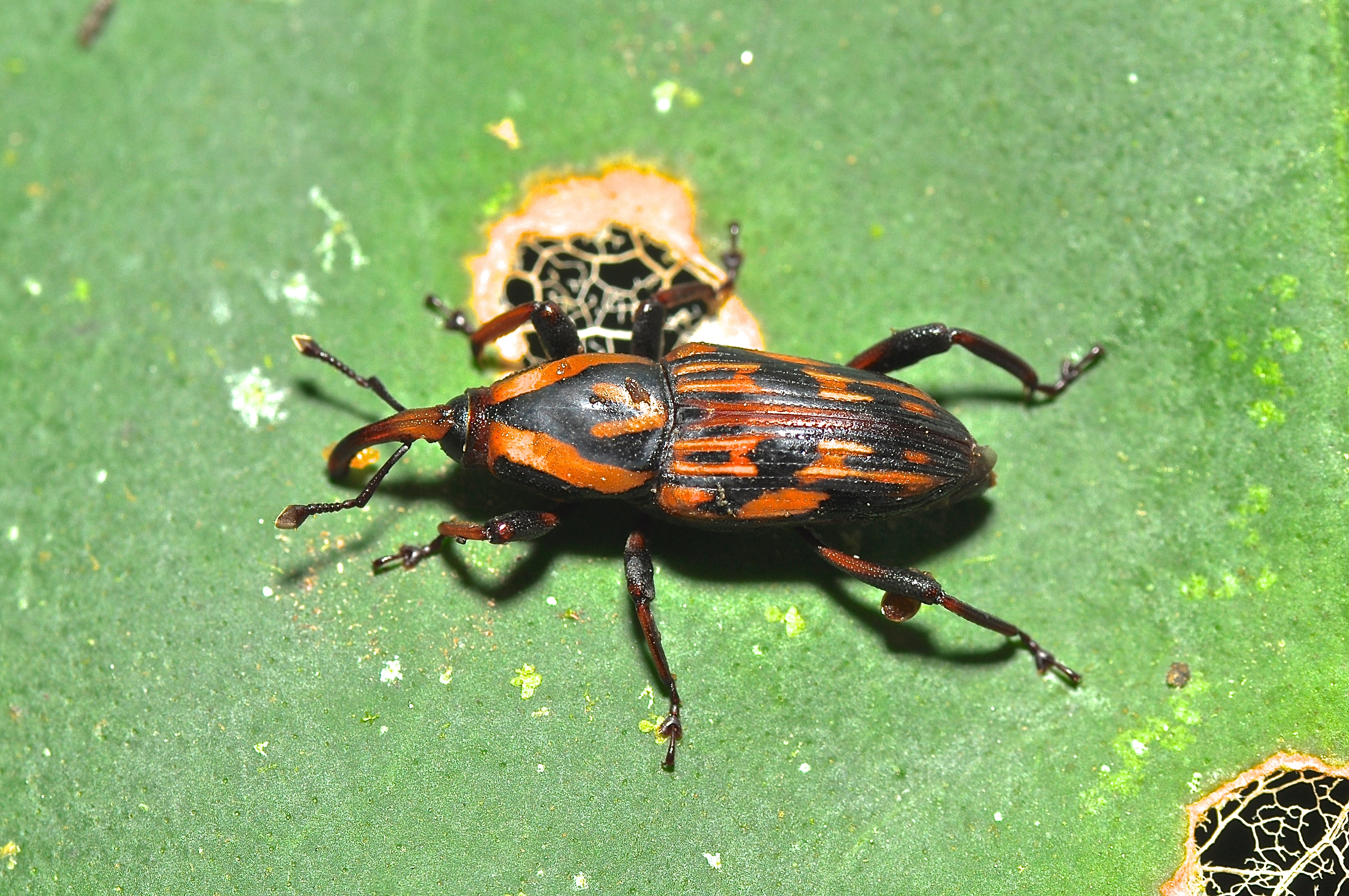

Scientific classification
- Kingdom: Animalia
- Phylum: Arthropoda
- Class: Insecta
- Order: Coleoptera
- Suborder: Polyphaga
- Infraorder: Cucujiformia
- Family: Curculionidae
- Subfamily: Dryophthorinae
- Tribe: Rhynchophorini
- Genus: Metamasius; Horn, 1873

Diversity
- at least 120 species

= Metamasius =

Genus of beetles

Metamasius is a genus of bromeliad weevils in the beetle subfamily Dryophthorinae. There are more than 120 described species in Metamasius.

== See also ==
- List of Metamasius species
