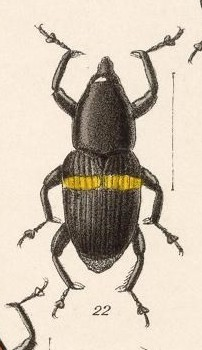
- Metamasius callizona (illustrated 1910)

Scientific classification
- Domain: Eukaryota
- Kingdom: Animalia
- Phylum: Arthropoda
- Class: Insecta
- Order: Coleoptera
- Suborder: Polyphaga
- Infraorder: Cucujiformia
- Family: Curculionidae
- Genus: Metamasius
- Species: M. callizona

Binomial name
- Metamasius callizona Chevrolat, 1882

= Metamasius callizona =

Species of beetle

Metamasius callizona, the Mexican bromeliad weevil, is a type which of beetle. It is an invasive species in Florida, US that targets several species of bromeliad. This species is native to southern Mexico, Guatemala, and Panama, and was first documented in Florida in 1989.

== Life history ==
=== Physical characteristics ===
Adult beetles range from 11 mm to 16 mm long, and are black with a thin orange band width-wise across their elytra. Females lay elongated eggs that are roughly 2 mm long and 1 mm wide, which change colour from white, to yellow, to light brown with time after being laid.

=== Life cycle ===
Metamasius callizona are multivoltine, holometabolous insects with 5 larval instars, on average taking roughly 58 days to progress from egg to adult. All life stages of M. callizona can be found on an individual host plant, where adult females chew slices in leaves near optimal feeding sites and proceed to lay individual eggs within the fresh slices.

=== Feeding ===
Adult M. callizona beetles eat the leaves of host bromeliads, which is usually not fatal to the host plant; however, larval life stages mine the tissue of the plant stems and often lead to plant death. Weevils are limited in their ability to survive on a host by its size. Any given bromeliad must be large enough to support at least one individual or it will likely go un-infected. In their native range, M. callizona specialize on bromeliads in the genus Tillandsia.

== Invaded area ==
As an invasive species, M. callizona has decimated the populations of several bromeliad species in Florida, where it has established an invaded range in southern and central Florida, to a straight-line boundary in the north between the Western Hillsborough County, and the Eastern Volusia County. The first specimen arrived in Florida on the decorative Tillandsia ionantha bromeliad from Mexico, on which adults feed but do not lay eggs. They have since expanded feeding sources to include several different genera.

Spread of the weevil was facilitated by the transport and propagation of infected bromeliads between Florida counties, primarily in the gardening industry. Twelve of sixteen Florida bromeliad species are susceptible to M. callizona attack, and the other four are generally safe because of their small size. M. callizona is a significant concern for T. utriculata which are directly killed, even by adult beetles.

== Management and control ==
=== Prevention ===
As it goes with most invasive species, prevention of spread is the most effective way to minimize the effects that invaders have on native species. Chemical dips on imported bromeliads have been suggested to kill off any stow-away insects, as well as restricting imports to allow only seeds by banning host species from being brought into Florida. Unfortunately, prevention is no longer an option for many Florida counties that already have established M. callizona populations. Areas that are already invaded must choose from a variety of other control options.

=== Chemical control ===
Insecticides that target adult and larval life stages have been proposed and implemented in bromeliad nurseries and other gardening practices, however, chemical controls are not a practical management plan for larger natural areas.

=== Biological control ===
Populations of M. callizona in their native range are much smaller than Florida populations because they are likely regulated a specialist parasitoid that is not present in the invaded Florida range. The use of parasitoid Lixadmontia franki, which preys on a closely related weevil species in Honduran cloud forests, has been suggested.

Adult L. franki females lay their eggs on bromeliad plants in areas displaying fresh M. callizona activity; the fly larvae then mobilize and target weevil larvae which they kill before the host has a chance to pupate. L. franki have been documented as natural parasitoids of M. callizona. L. franki were captive-raised and studied for several years, after an adequate amount of research and the preparation of proper permits they were released in 2007 in an attempt to control weevil populations. Bromeliad seeds of several species, particularly those rendered endangered by M. callizona, were collected for release if the biological control proved to be effective.
