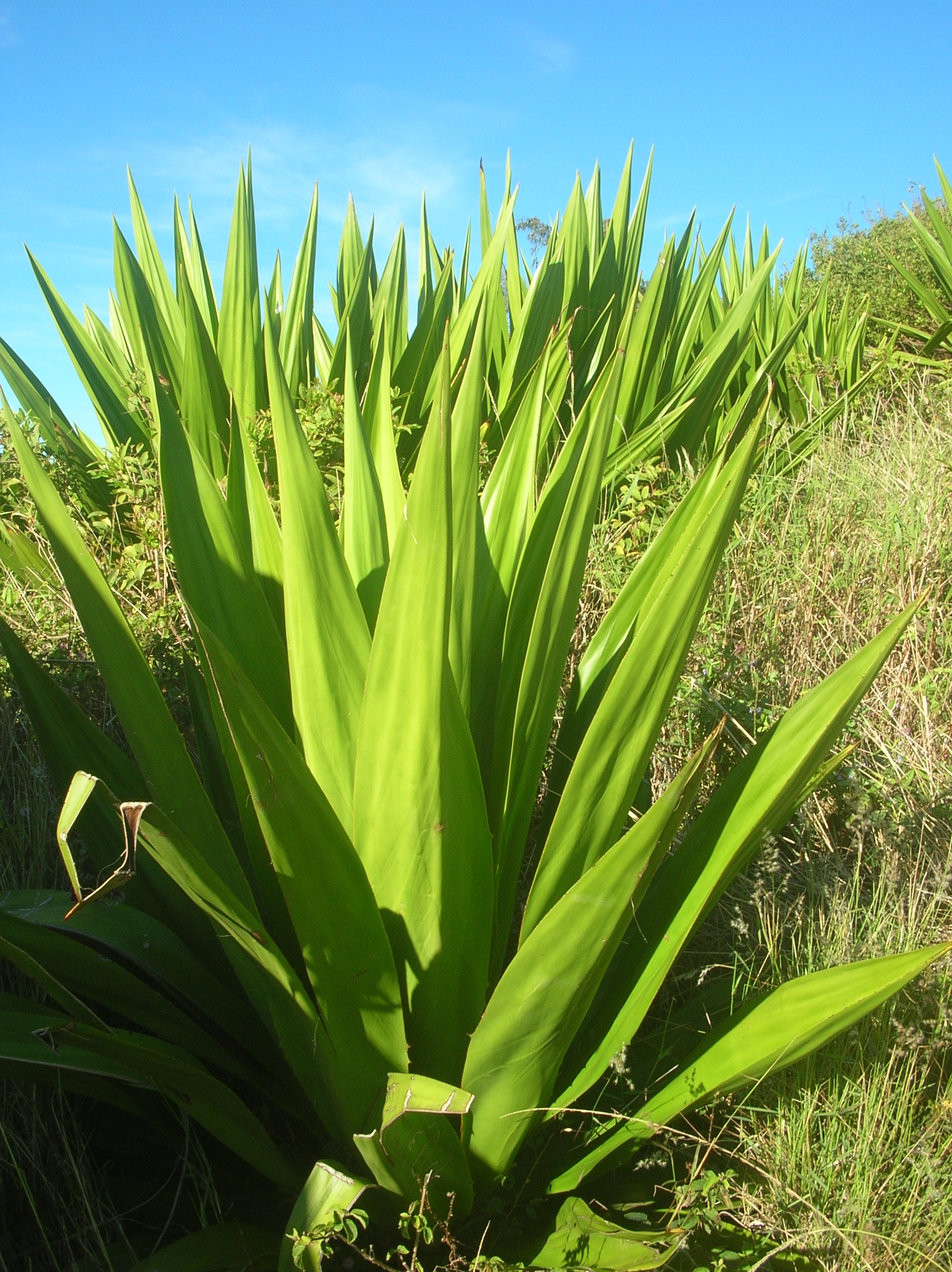

Scientific classification
- Kingdom: Plantae
- Clade: Tracheophytes
- Clade: Angiosperms
- Clade: Monocots
- Order: Asparagales
- Family: Asparagaceae
- Subfamily: Agavoideae
- Genus: Furcraea
- Species: F. foetida

Binomial name
- Furcraea foetida (L.) Haw.

Synonyms
- Agave foetida L.; Aloe foetida (L.) Crantz; Furcraea gigantea Vent.; Funium piliferum Willemet; Furcraea madagascariensis Haw.; Agave madagascariensis (Haw.) Salm-Dyck; Agave commelyni Salm-Dyck; Agave gigantea (Vent.) D.Dietr.; Furcraea commelyni (Salm-Dyck) Kunth; Fourcroya gigantea (Vent.) Hook.; Furcraea barillettii Jacobi; Agave bulbosa W.Bull; Furcraea atroviridis Jacobi & Goeff.; Furcraea viridis Hemsl.; Furcraea watsoniana Sander; Furcraea gigantea var. mediopicta Trel. in L.H.Bailey

= Furcraea foetida =

Species of flowering plant

Furcraea foetida (giant gabuya, green-aloe or Mauritius-hemp) is a species of flowering plant native to the Caribbean and northern South America. It is widely cultivated and reportedly naturalized in many places (India, parts of Africa, Portugal, Australia, Thailand, Florida, New Zealand, and many oceanic islands).

== Description ==
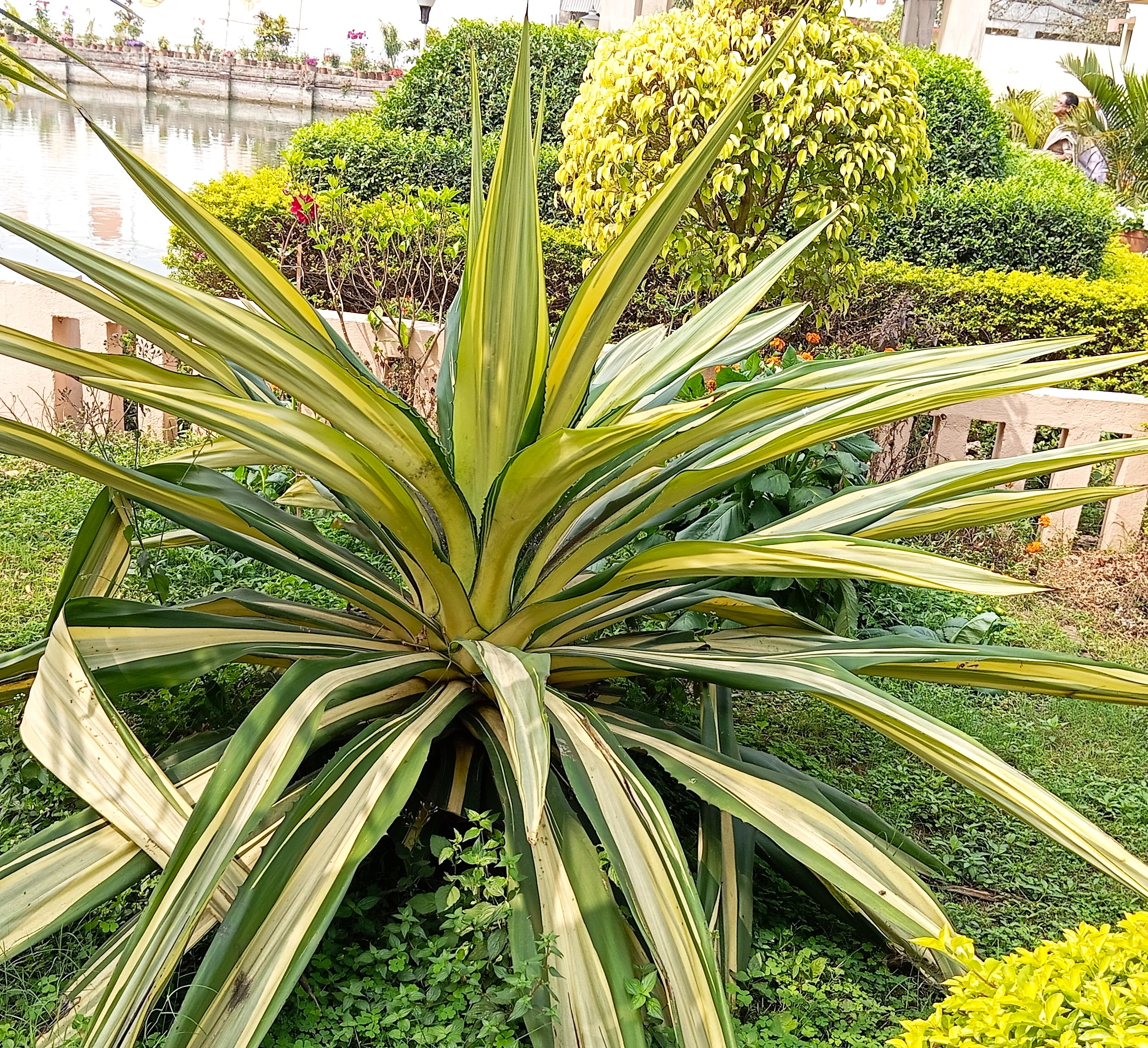
Mauritius hemp (Furcraea foetida) in Ramakrishna Mission Vivekananda Educational and Research Institute campus as an ornamental plant, Belur Math, India.

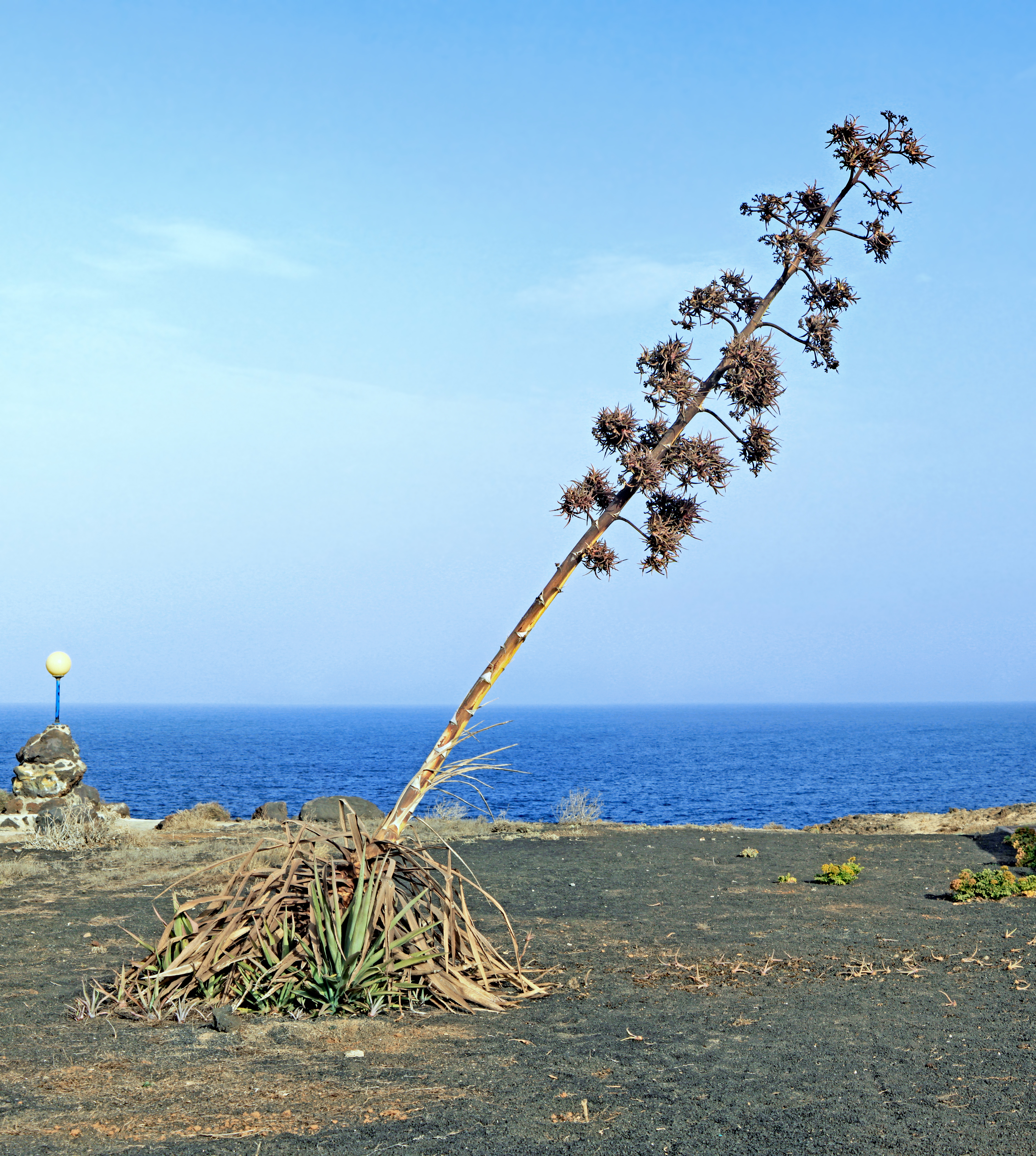
Plant with bulbils

Furcraea foetida is an monocarpic-perennial (to evergreen) subshrub, closely related to the North American Agave and Yucca genera. The plants are generally stemless; larger, more mature specimens may develop a short, trunk-like stem over time, growing approximately one meter (3 feet) tall. The leaves (which are somewhat more pliable than those of the agaves) are sword-shaped, 1-1.8 m long and 10–15 cm broad at their widest point, narrowing to 6–7 cm broad at the leaf base to a sharp spine tip at the apex. The leaves emerge one-by-one, almost in a “rosette” formation from the ground, one leaf unfurling at a time. Leaf margins are entirely smooth in some varieties, or edged with hooked spines in others. The flowers are greenish to creamy white, 4 cm long, and strongly scented; they are produced on a large inflorescence up to 7.5 m tall. As with other monocarpic plants, the flowering section dies-back after blooming and setting seed, normally leaving behind young plants (or “pups”), which emerge from the roots and from the rhizome, surrounding the bottom of the main “mother” plant.

Cultivation

The plant is cultivated in subtropical and tropical regions as a fiber and textile product, and as an ornamental plant for appropriate gardens. Its leaves are mainly used to produce a natural fiber similar to sisal, with large plantations dedicated to its cultivation in East Africa.
