= Furcraea niquivilensis =

Scientific classification
- Kingdom: Plantae
- Clade: Tracheophytes
- Clade: Angiosperms
- Clade: Monocots
- Order: Asparagales
- Family: Asparagaceae
- Subfamily: Agavoideae
- Genus: Furcraea
- Species: F. niquivilensis

Binomial name
- Furcraea niquivilensis Matuda ex García-Mend.

Species of flowering plant

Furcraea niquivilensis is a plant species native to Chiapas, Mexico.

Furcraea niquivilensisis a monocarpic shrub with a trunk up to 3 m tall, 40 cm in diameter. It produces a rosette of up to 150 leaves. Each leaf is lanceolate to sword-shaped, up to 210 cm long, 14 cm across, armed with sharp curved prickles up to 8 mm long along the margins. Flowering stalks can reach a height of 9 m, bearing a large panicle of greenish-white flowers.

== Uses ==
The people who live in the area where the species grows plant it to control erosion. They also use the fibers in making ropes and baskets. Other members of the same genus, called fique, are used in South America in similar fashion.
