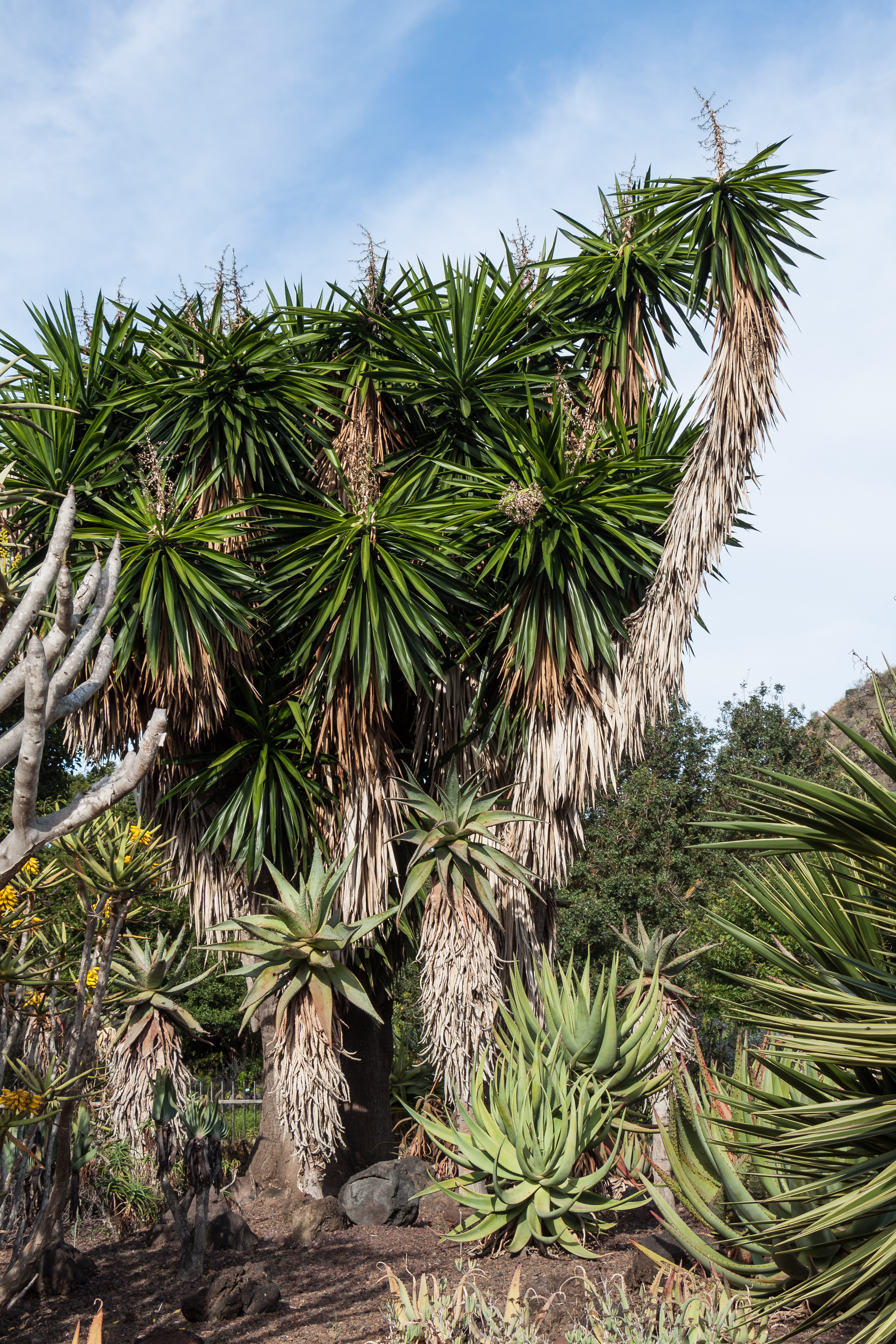

Scientific classification
- Kingdom: Plantae
- Clade: Embryophytes
- Clade: Tracheophytes
- Clade: Spermatophytes
- Clade: Angiosperms
- Clade: Monocots
- Order: Asparagales
- Family: Asparagaceae
- Subfamily: Agavoideae
- Genus: Yucca
- Species: Y. gigantea

Binomial name
- Yucca gigantea Lem.

Synonyms
- Dracaena lennei Baker; Dracaena yuccoides Baker; Sarcoyucca elephantipes Linding., nom. superfl.; Yucca eleana W.Watson; Yucca elephantipes Regel ex Trel., nom. illeg.; Yucca elephantipes var. ghiesbreghtii Molon; Yucca ghiesbreghtii Baker; Yucca guatemalensis Baker; Yucca lenneana Baker; Yucca mazelii W.Watson; Yucca mooreana Baker; Yucca roezlii Baker

= Yucca gigantea =

Species of flowering plant

Yucca gigantea (syn. Yucca elephantipes) is a species of flowering plant in the asparagus family, native to Mexico and Central America. Growing up to 8–12 m (26–39 ft) in height, it is an evergreen shrub which is widely cultivated as an ornamental garden or house plant, often referred to simply as yucca cane. The edible flower is the national flower of El Salvador locally called izote, and it is used extensively in Salvadoran cuisine.

== Names ==
Common names include spineless yucca, soft-tip yucca, blue-stem yucca, giant yucca, yucca cane, and itabo. Its flower, the izote, is the national flower of El Salvador.

== Description ==
Yucca gigantea is typically less than 6 m (20 ft) in height. It may have a thick, single trunk or be multitrunked, growing from a thickened, inflated, trunk-like lower base similar to an elephant's foot. The exceptionally narrow leaves fan out in clumps. They are strap-like, spineless and up to 1.2 m (4 ft) in length. White flowers are produced in the summer. Mature plants produce erect spikes of pendent flowers up to 1 m (3 ft 3 in) in length. Flowers are followed by brown, fleshy fruits which are oval and up to 2.5 cm (1 in) long.

== Taxonomy ==
The French botanist Charles Lemaire published the name Yucca gigantea in November 1859. This is the name used by the World Checklist of Selected Plant Families as of January 2014, although other sources use Yucca guatemalensis, published by Baker in 1872.

The species is still most widely known in horticultural literature as Yucca elephantipes. The first mention of that name was by the German horticulturalist Eduard von Regel in February 1859. He claimed that a different species, Y. aloifolia, was sometimes known as Y. elephantipes when grown in European gardens because of its thickened stem base. However, since he did not intend to offer Y. elephantipes as the actual correct name, this was not a valid publication. In a major article on yuccas and relatives in 1902, the American botanist William Trelease also used the name Y. elephantipes, referring to Regel's 1859 publication. This came too late though, as Y. gigantea had by then already been established. Y. elephantipes must therefore be regarded as an illegitimate name, according to the strict rules of the ICN.

== Distribution ==
Yucca gigantea is found natively in Belize, Costa Rica, El Salvador, Guatemala, Honduras, Nicaragua and the eastern part of Mexico (Quintana Roo, Yucatán, Campeche, Tabasco, Chiapas, Veracruz, eastern Puebla and southern Tamaulipas).

It is also reportedly naturalized in Ecuador, El Salvador, Italy, the Leeward Islands, Portugal, Puerto Rico, and Spain.

== Cultivation ==
The species can be grown in a variety of soils and is drought-tolerant. Young plants are occasionally used as houseplants. However the species grows best in a hot semi-arid climate, so plants are subject to root rot if overwatered. Older plants are generally the most susceptible. For this reason young, shorter trees are superior houseplants as they are more adaptable to environmental changes. The species has some cold tolerance, rated as hardiness zone 9b, but it is nowhere near as hardy as other yucca from more northern deserts. Yucca gigantea can be affected by a number of pests including scale, yucca moth borers, and yucca weevils. Leaf spot may affect the appearance of the leaves, but it does not affect the health of the plant. Propagation is by suckers, cuttings or seed.

Under the synonym Yucca elephantipes this species has gained the Royal Horticultural Society's Award of Garden Merit.

== Uses ==
This section describes the gastronomic use of the flower in Latin America, but the specific examples are not unique to that region. There are hundreds of ways the flower is used in cooking due to the hundreds of indigenous tribes spanning from North to South America that ate Yucca flowers.

The flower petals are commonly eaten in Central America, but its reproductive organs (the anthers and ovaries) are first removed because of their bitterness. The petals are blanched for 5 minutes, and then cooked a la mexicana (with tomato, onion, chile) or in tortitas con salsa (egg-battered patties with green or red sauce). In Guatemala, they are boiled and eaten with lemon juice.

In El Salvador, the tender tips of stems are eaten, and known locally as cogollo de izote.

== Gallery ==
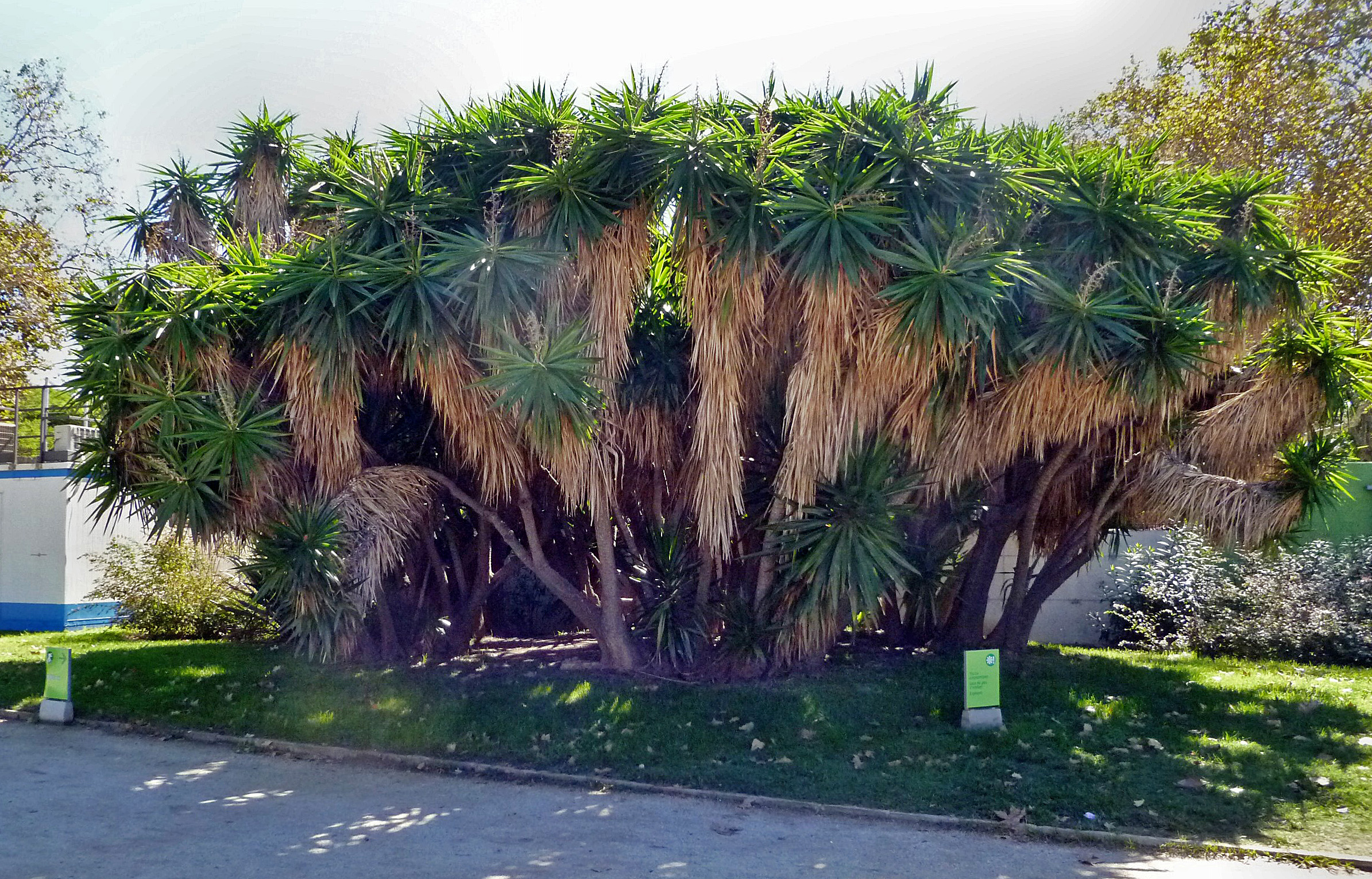
Yucca gigantea in the Parc de la Ciutadella, Barcelona

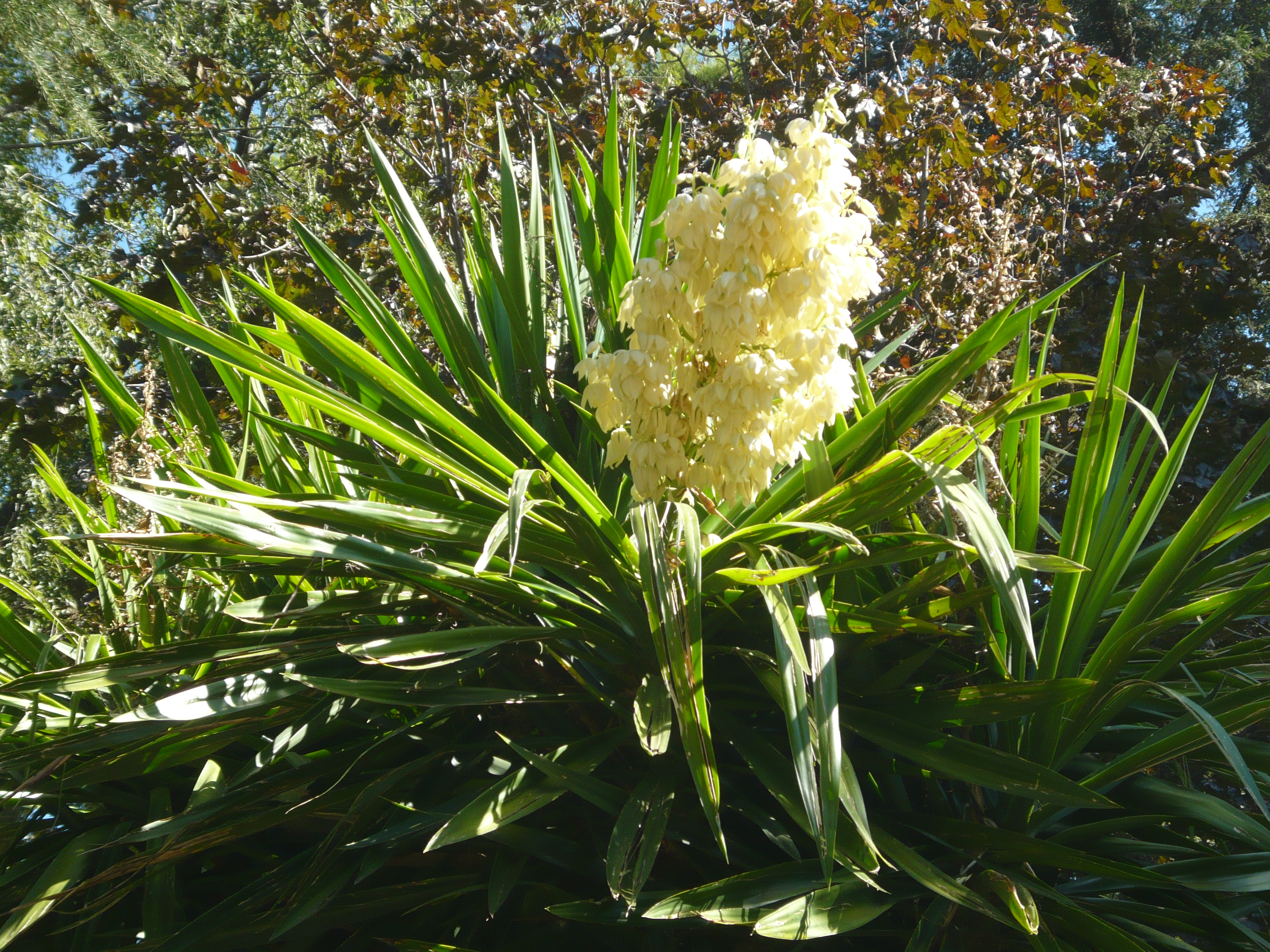
Izote, the national flower of El Salvador

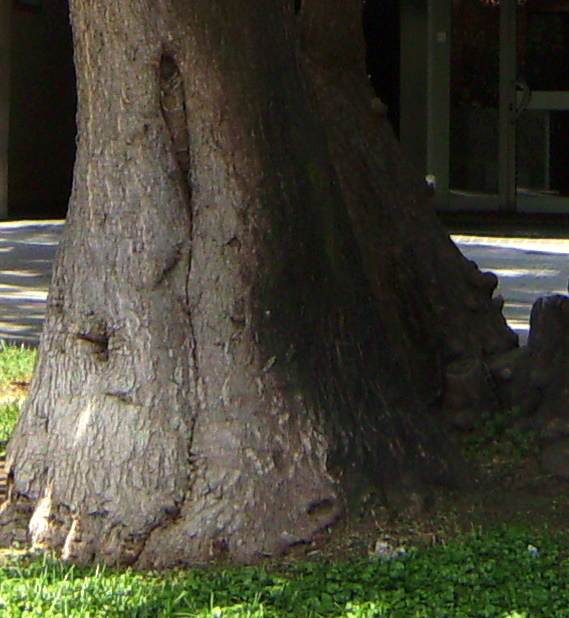
Detail of the trunk base, similar to an elephant foot (hence the synonym elephantipes)

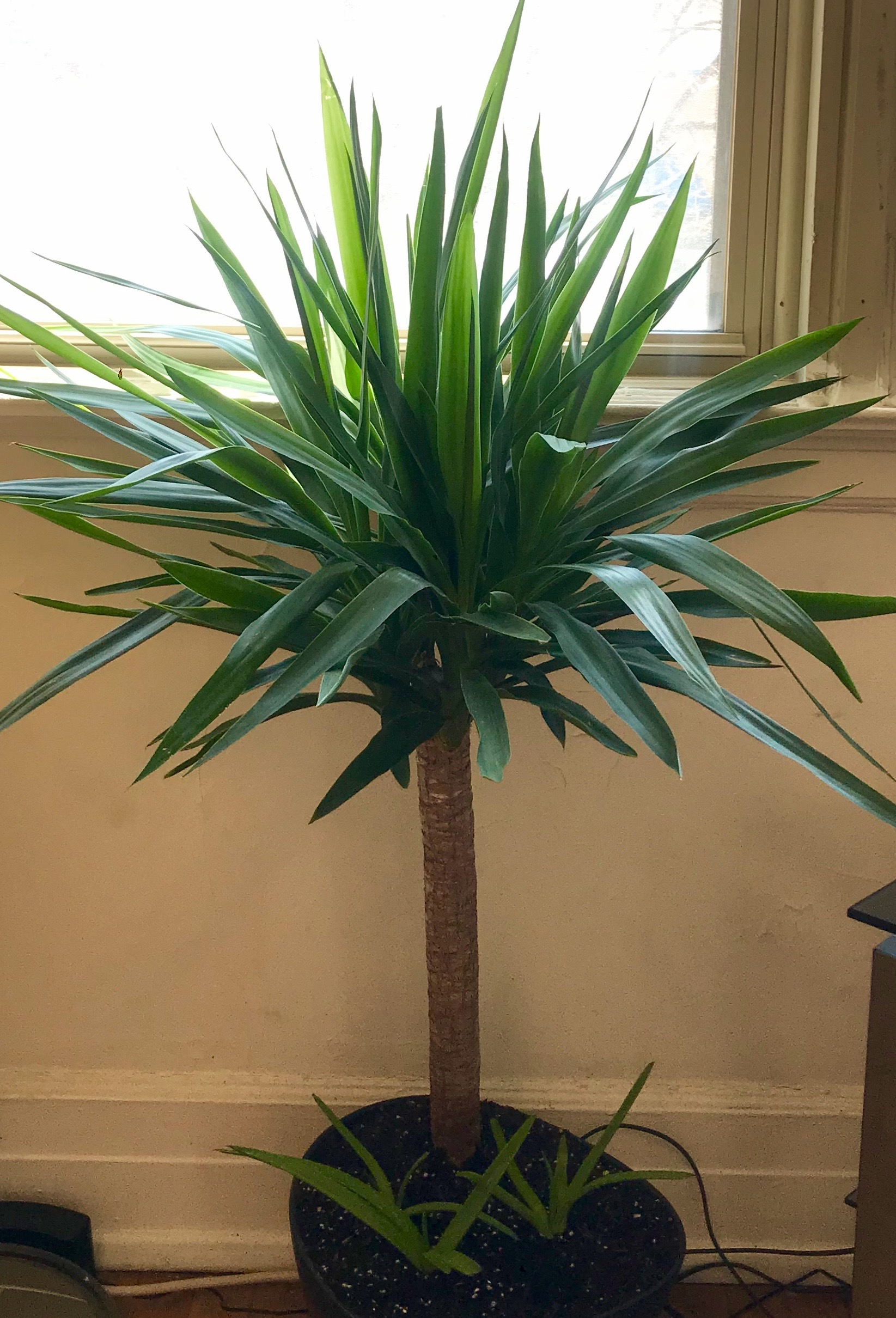
Young Yucca gigantea and Aloe vera kept as a houseplant
