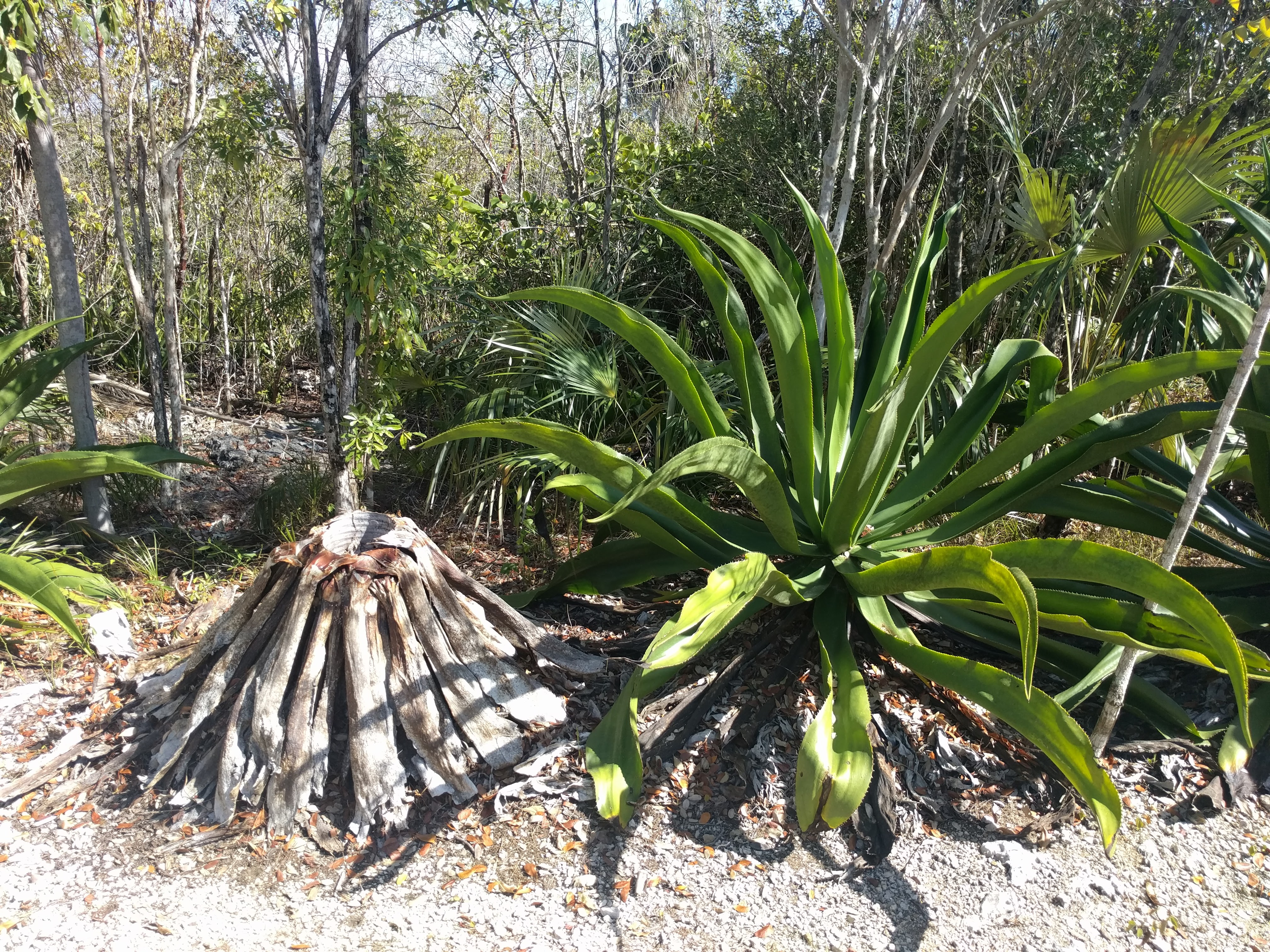

Conservation status
- Endangered (IUCN 3.1)

Scientific classification
- Kingdom: Plantae
- Clade: Tracheophytes
- Clade: Angiosperms
- Clade: Monocots
- Order: Asparagales
- Family: Asparagaceae
- Subfamily: Agavoideae
- Genus: Agave
- Species: A. caymanensis

Binomial name
- Agave caymanensis Proctor, 2012

= Agave caymanensis =

Species of flowering plant

Agave caymanensis is a species of agave that is endemic to Grand Cayman, Little Cayman and Cayman Brac in the Cayman Islands. It can be found in dry shrubland at all elevations of the islands. A. caymanensis gradually forms a short trunk, that is clothed in dead leaves. It can reach heights of 4 m and widths of 3 m with a rosette of massive, succulent leaves rimmed with thorns. It is monocarpic, and flowering is quite synchronous. Young rock iguanas sometimes use the hollow core of dead flower spikes as a refuge. This species was previously confused with A. sobolifera until described by Proctor as a separate species in 2012.

This species has a generation length of 20–70 years, and is a co-dominant species in the dry (xerophytic) shrublands of the Cayman Islands.

Due to its declining population and limited range, the IUCN declared A. caymanensis an endangered plant. It is threatened by habitat loss and fragmentation caused by all forms of development on the islands, including deforestation, urban and tourism development and conversion to agriculture. It is estimated that there are now just over 1 million extant plants, a dramatic decrease from three generations ago, when the population was estimated to be 1.3 to 1.5 million individuals. It is projected that the population will decrease by 61% over the next 60 to 100 years. It may become susceptible to an invasive agave-eating weevil, Scyphophorus acupunctatus, which impacts similar habitats on nearby islands.
