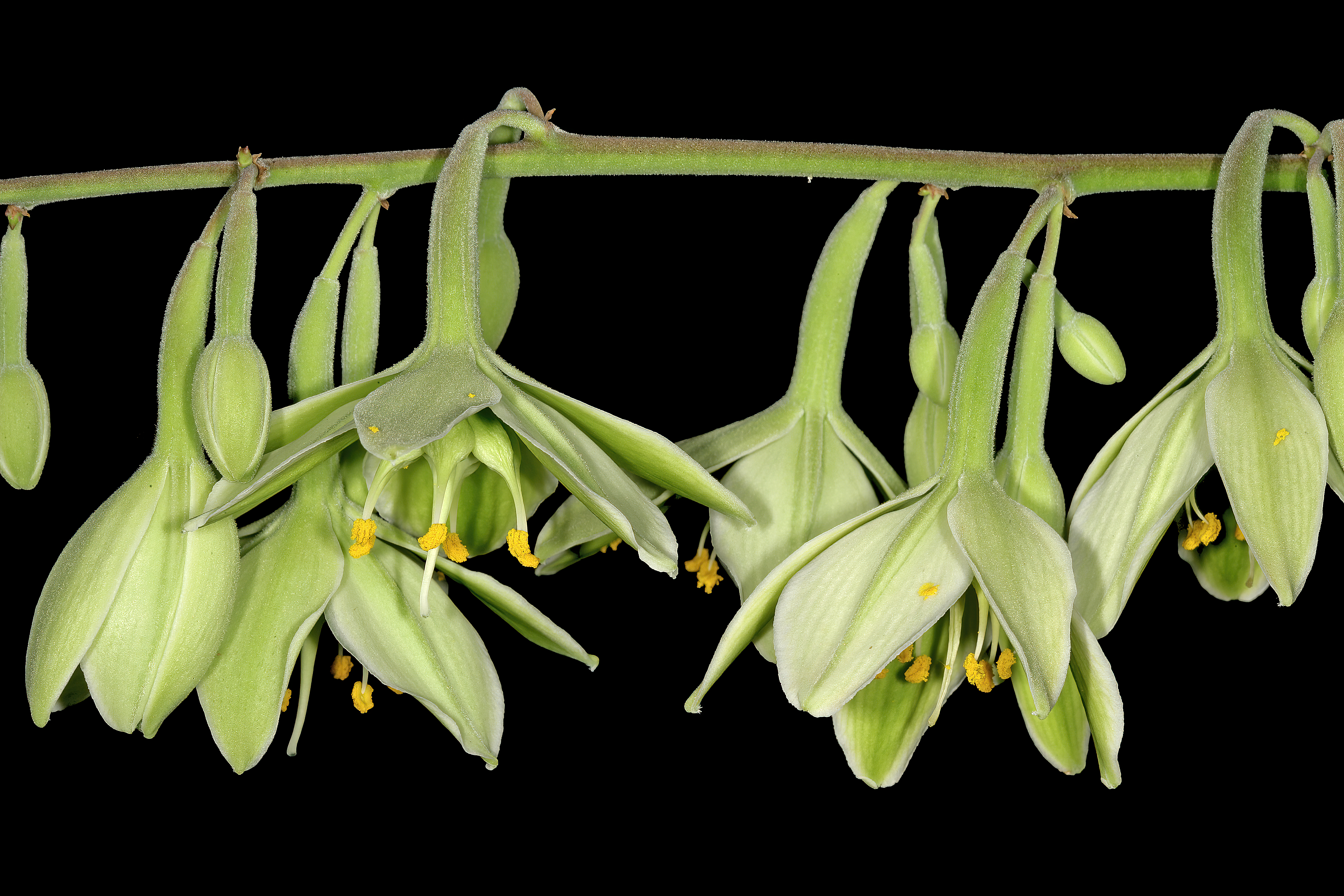
- Flowers
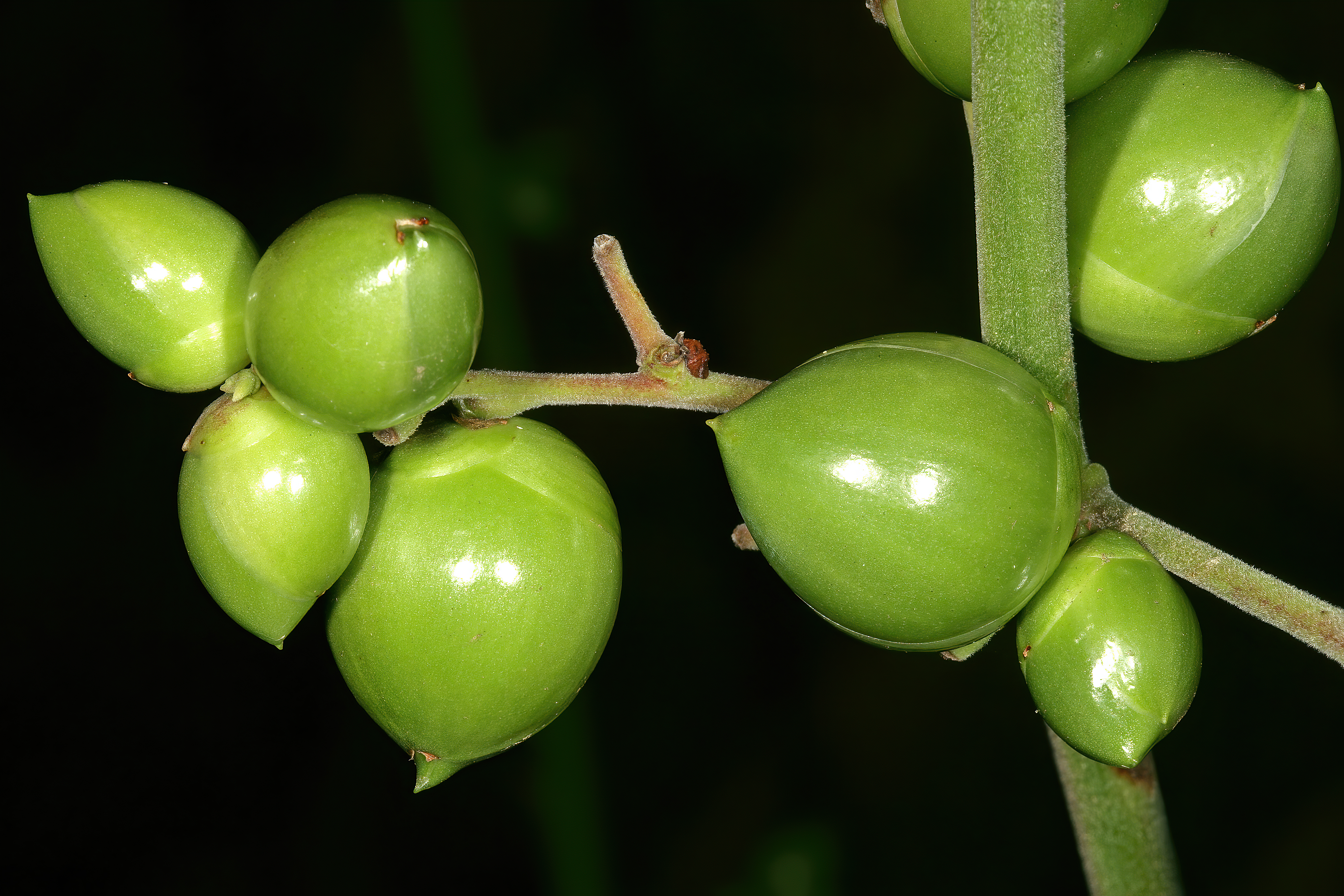
- Bulbils

Scientific classification
- Kingdom: Plantae
- Clade: Embryophytes
- Clade: Tracheophytes
- Clade: Spermatophytes
- Clade: Angiosperms
- Clade: Monocots
- Order: Asparagales
- Family: Asparagaceae
- Subfamily: Agavoideae
- Genus: Furcraea
- Species: F. hexapetala

Binomial name
- Furcraea hexapetala (Jacq.) Urb.

= Furcraea hexapetala =

Species of plant

Furcraea hexapetala is a semi-succulent mesocaul or pachycaul rarely branching shrub bearing a large panicle of six-petaled flowers on a peduncle up to 7 m (23 ft) length. Besides flowers and fruit, the 2 m (6 ft 7 in) panicle also produces bulbils (a form of asexual reproduction.

The species is found in south eastern Mexico, Ecuador and parts of the Caribbean.
