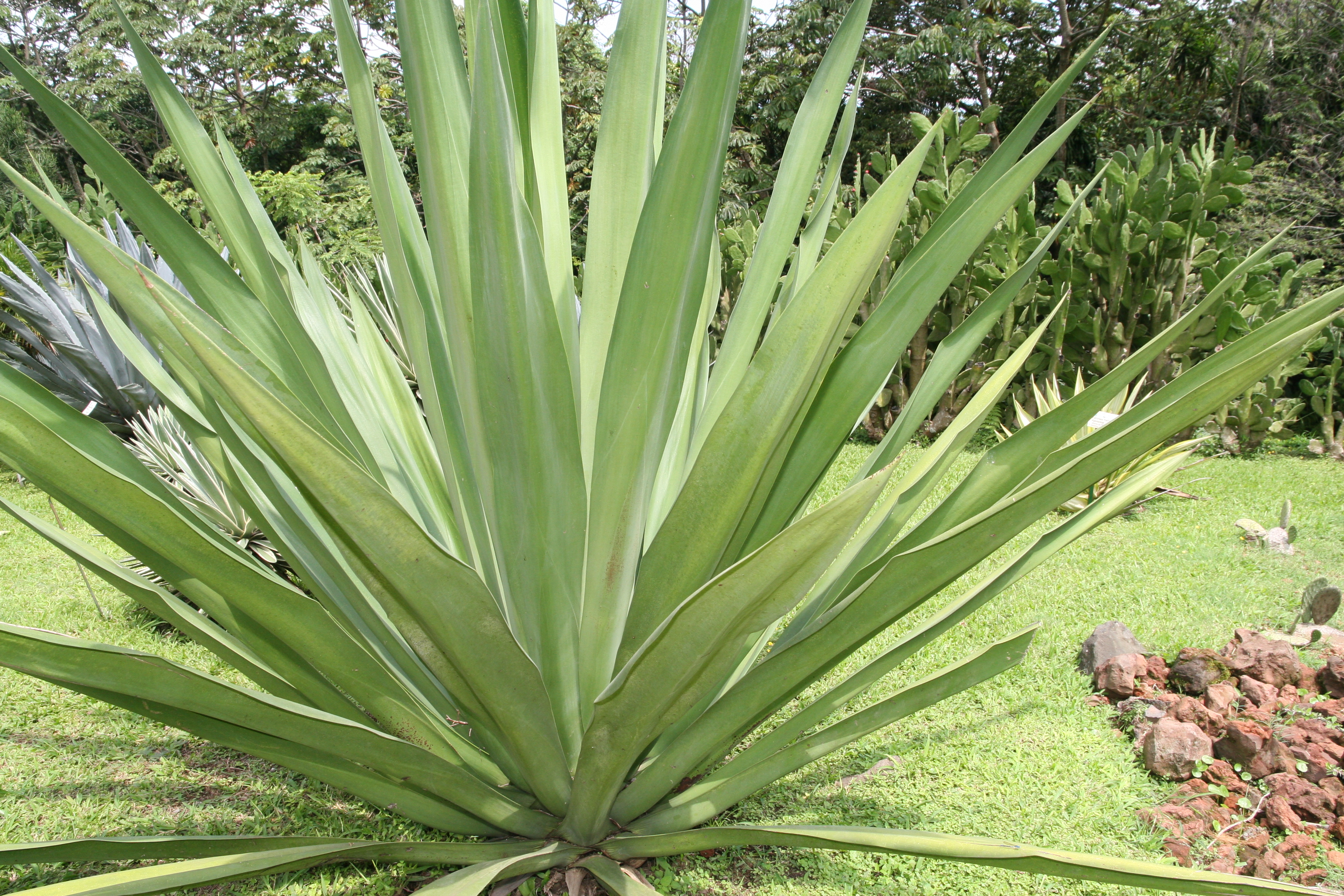

Scientific classification
- Kingdom: Plantae
- Clade: Tracheophytes
- Clade: Angiosperms
- Clade: Monocots
- Order: Asparagales
- Family: Asparagaceae
- Subfamily: Agavoideae
- Genus: Furcraea
- Species: F. cabuya

Binomial name
- Furcraea cabuya Trel.

= Furcraea cabuya =

Species of flowering plant

Furcraea cabuya is a species of plant in the family Asparagaceae that is native to South America. The fibres in its leaves, known as fique, are used in making ropes.
