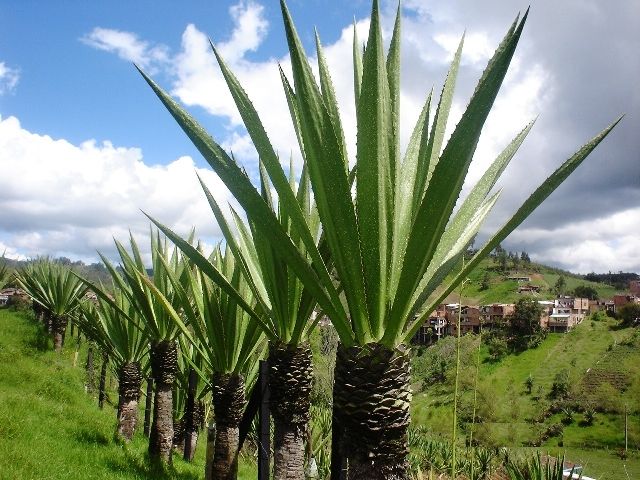

Scientific classification
- Kingdom: Plantae
- Clade: Tracheophytes
- Clade: Angiosperms
- Clade: Monocots
- Order: Asparagales
- Family: Asparagaceae
- Subfamily: Agavoideae
- Genus: Furcraea
- Species: F. andina

Binomial name
- Furcraea andina Trel.

= Furcraea andina =

Species of flowering plant

Furcraea andina is a species of flowering plant in the family Asparagaceae. It is native to Ecuador, Peru and Bolivia in South America. The fibres in its leaves, known as fique, are used in making ropes.
