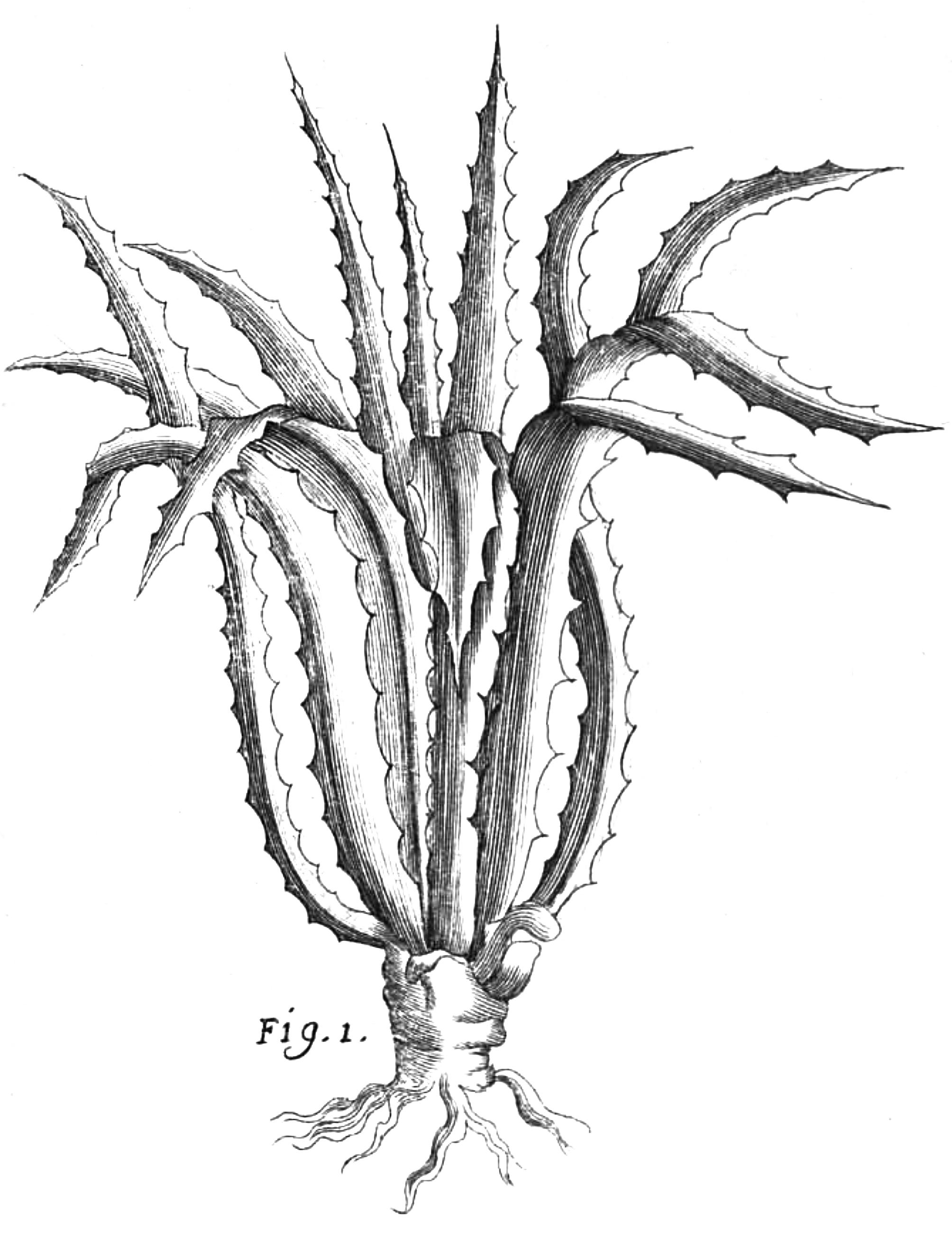
- Illustration that is the type of the species

Scientific classification
- Kingdom: Plantae
- Clade: Tracheophytes
- Clade: Angiosperms
- Clade: Monocots
- Order: Asparagales
- Family: Asparagaceae
- Subfamily: Agavoideae
- Genus: Furcraea
- Species: F. tuberosa

Binomial name
- Furcraea tuberosa (Mill.) W.T.Aiton

Synonyms
- Agave angustifolia Steud., non Agave angustifolia Haw.; Agave campanulata Sessé & Moc.; Agave spinosa (O.Targ.Tozz.) Steud.; Agave tuberosa Mill.; Fourcroya tuberosa (Mill.) Hook.; Furcraea geminispina Jacobi; Furcraea interrupta Trel.; Furcraea lipsiensis Jacobi; Furcraea spinosa O.Targ.Tozz.; Furcraea vivipara Anon.; Yucca superba Roxb.

= Furcraea tuberosa =

Species of flowering plant

Furcraea tuberosa is a species of flowering plant in the family Asparagaceae. It is native to the Caribbean, and it is naturalized in parts of South Africa. Plants have a limited use as a source of fibre.

== Description ==
Furcraea tuberosa is a large perennial plant with succulent leaves. It is either stemless or has a stem less than 30 cm (1 ft) high. The numerous leaves are arranged in a rosette and range from more-or-less upright to spreading. They are 1.0–1.8 m (3–6 ft) long with marginal reddish brown teeth about 5 mm (0.2 in) long. The Inflorescence is a many-branched panicle, about 5–8 m (16–26 ft) tall. The flowering stem bears many ovoid bulbils. The flowers are arranged in groups of three on stalks (pedicels) 6–10 mm (0.2–0.4 in) long. The flowers are about 4 cm (1.6 in) long with six greenish white tepals.

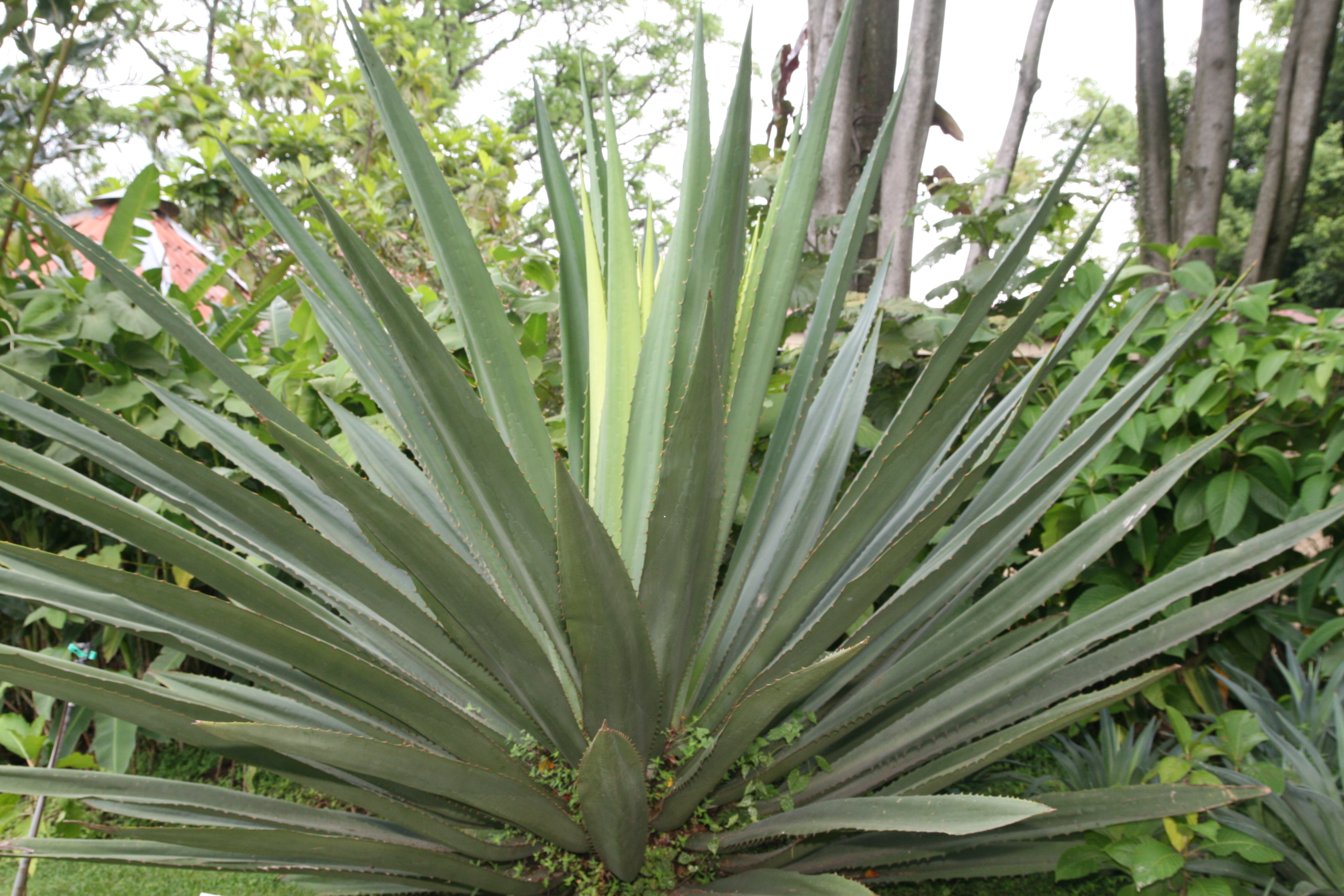
Habit

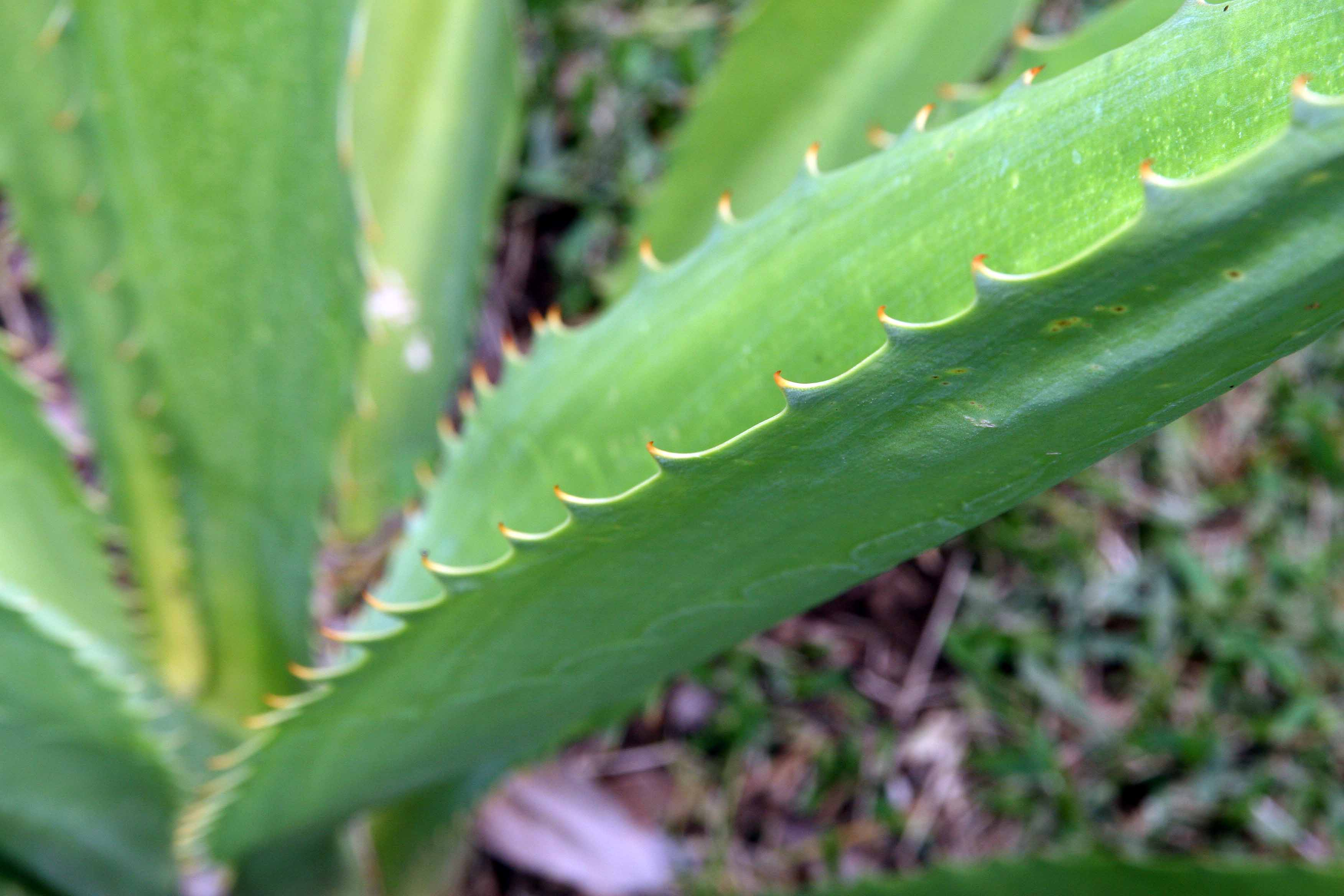
Marginal spines

== Taxonomy ==
The species was first described as Agave tuberosa by Philip Miller in 1768, based on an illustration published in 1696 in Leonard Plukenet's Phytographia. It was transferred to the genus Furcraea by William Townsend Aiton in the second edition of Hortus Kewensis, dated to 1811 (although Aiton wrongly attributed the original name to Carl Ludwig Willdenow).

== Distribution ==
Furcraea tuberosa is native to the Caribbean: Cuba, the Dominican Republic, Haiti, Jamaica, the Leeward Islands, Puerto Rico and the Windward Islands. It has also become naturalized in the Mpumalanga Province of South Africa, where it appears to be invasive via the distribution of bulbils rather than seed, which has not been observed.

== Uses ==
In Haiti, Furcraea tuberosa is used for its fibres, from which hammocks and ropes can be made. The species may have been spread within Cuba in the past by Haitian slaves; it is particularly found near roads and in small towns.
