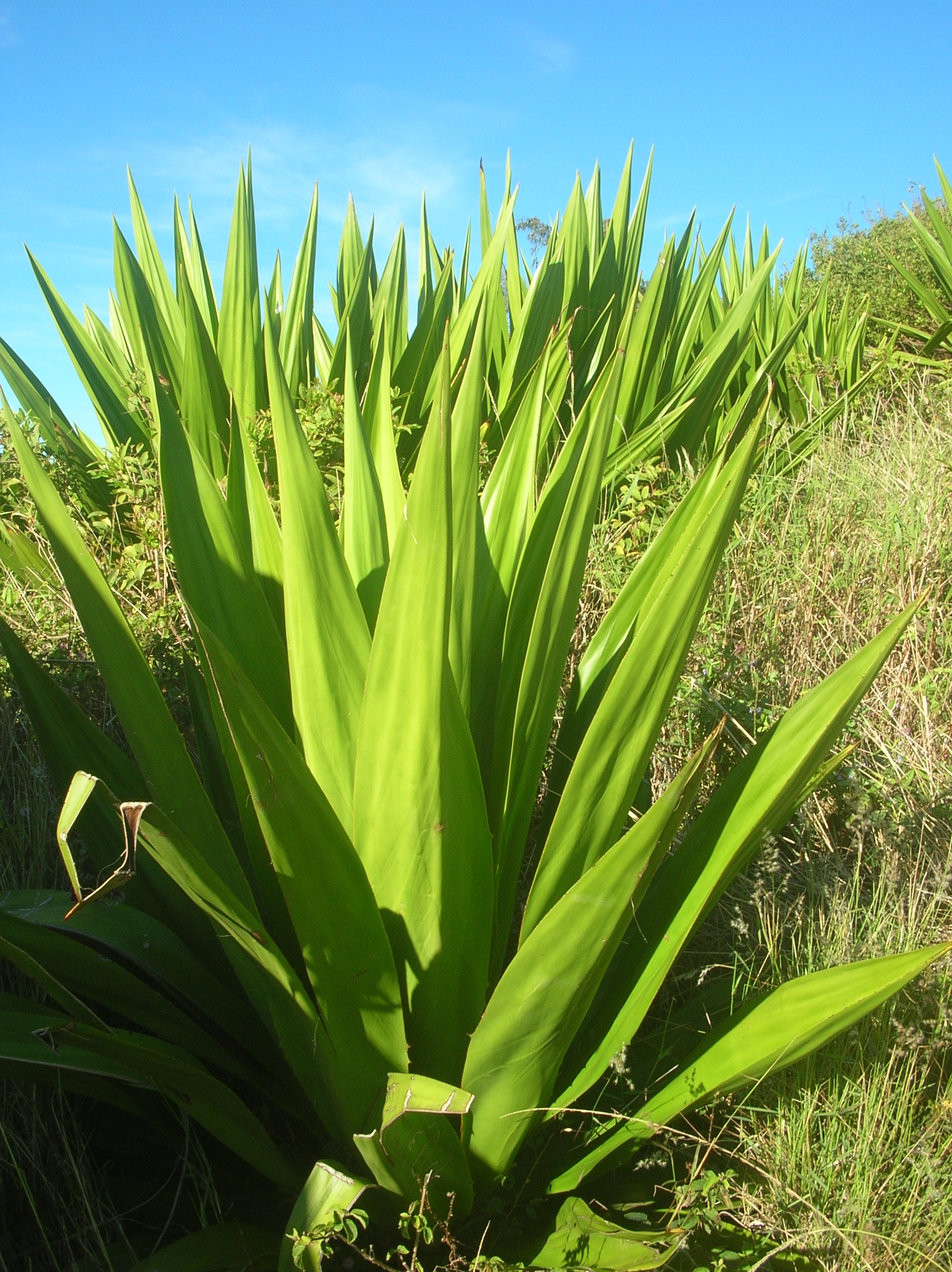
- Furcraea foetida in Hawaii

Scientific classification
- Kingdom: Plantae
- Clade: Embryophytes
- Clade: Tracheophytes
- Clade: Spermatophytes
- Clade: Angiosperms
- Clade: Monocots
- Order: Asparagales
- Family: Asparagaceae
- Subfamily: Agavoideae
- Genus: Furcraea; Vent.

Type species
- Furcraea cubensis (Jacq.) Vent.

Synonyms
- Fourcroya Spreng.; Funium P.Willemet; Roezlia Laurentius

= Furcraea =

Genus of flowering plants

Furcraea is a genus of succulent plants belonging to the family Asparagaceae, native to tropical regions of Mexico, the Caribbean, Central America and northern South America. Some species are also naturalized in parts of Africa, the United States (Florida), Portugal, Thailand, India, and Australia, as well as on various oceanic islands. Plants of this genus are the origin of fique or cabuyo, a natural fiber.

== Species ==
Image	Scientific name	Distribution
	Furcraea abisaii Gir.-Cañas	
	Furcraea acaulis (Kunth) B.Ullrich	Venezuela
	Furcraea andina Trel.	Peru, Ecuador
	Furcraea antillana A.Álvarez	Cuba, Hispaniola
	Furcraea boliviensis Ravenna	Bolivia
	Furcraea cabuya Trel.	tropical Mexico, Central America, Venezuela
	Furcraea depauperata Jacobi	Mexico but apparently extinct
	Furcraea flavoviridis Hook.	
	Furcraea foetida (L.) Haw. (Mauritius Hemp)	southern Caribbean; widely cultivated and naturalized elsewhere
	Furcraea guatemalensis Trel.	southern Mexico, Central America
	Furcraea guerrerensis Matuda	Guerrero
	Furcraea hexapetala (Jacq.) Urb. (Cuban Hemp)	southern Mexico, West Indies, Venezuela, Ecuador, Galápagos
	Furcraea longaeva Karw. & Zucc.	Puebla, Oaxaca
	Furcraea macdougallii Matuda	Puebla, Oaxaca, Chiapas
	Furcraea martinezii García-Mend. & L.de la Rosa	Guerrero
	Furcraea niquivilensis Matuda ex García-Mend.	Chiapas
	Furcraea occidentalis Trel.	Peru
	Furcraea parmentieri (Roezl) García-Mend.	southern Mexico
	Furcraea pubescens Tod.	
	Furcraea quicheensis Trel.	Chiapas, Guatemala, Honduras
	Furcraea samalana Trel.	Chiapas, Guatemala, El Salvador
	Furcraea selloa K.Koch (Wild Sisal)	Colombia, Ecuador; naturalized in Tamaulipas, Florida, Andaman Islands, India, Queensland
	Furcraea stratiotes Petersen	Nicaragua
	Furcraea stricta Jacobi	Trinidad, Colombia, Brazil
	Furcraea tuberosa (Mill.) W.T.Aiton (Female Karata)	West Indies; naturalized in South Africa
	Furcraea undulata Jacobi	tropical Mexico, El Salvador

== See also ==
- Fique
