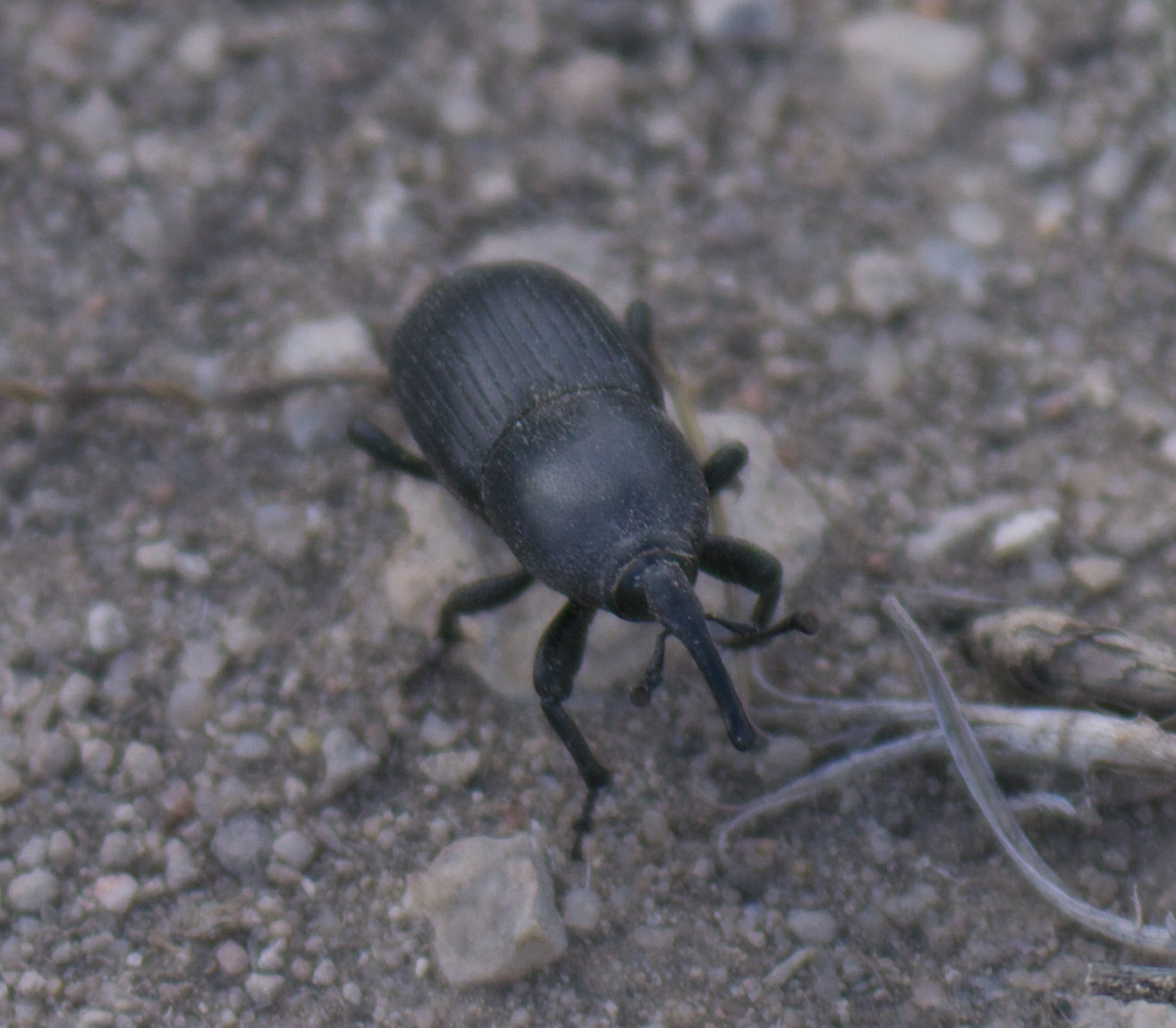

Scientific classification
- Kingdom: Animalia
- Phylum: Arthropoda
- Class: Insecta
- Order: Coleoptera
- Suborder: Polyphaga
- Infraorder: Cucujiformia
- Family: Curculionidae
- Tribe: Sphenophorini
- Genus: Scyphophorus; Schönherr, 1838

= Scyphophorus =

Genus of beetles

Scyphophorus is a genus of snout and bark beetles in the subfamily Dryophthorinae of the true weevils (Curculionidae). There are about 7 described species in Scyphophorus.

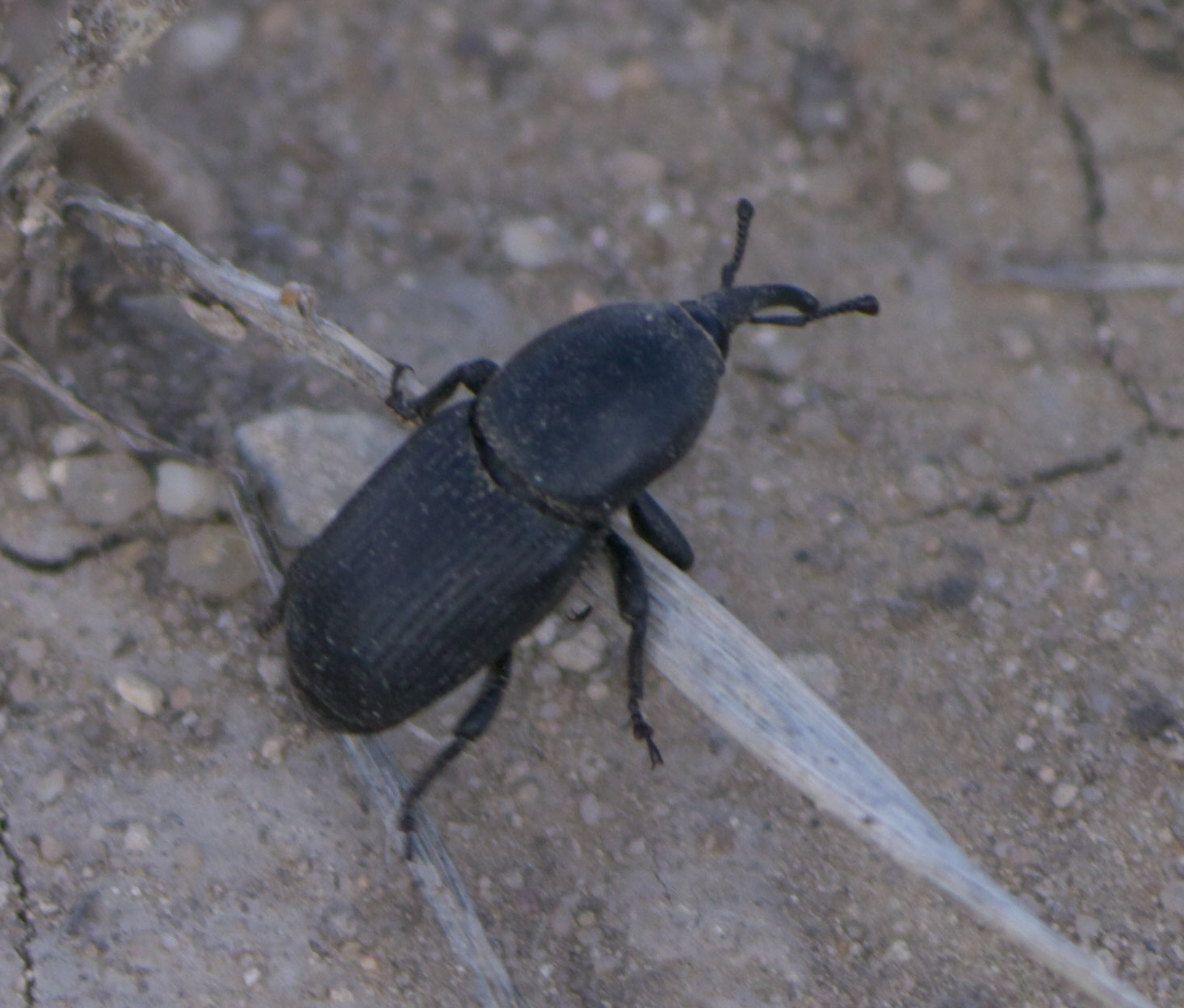

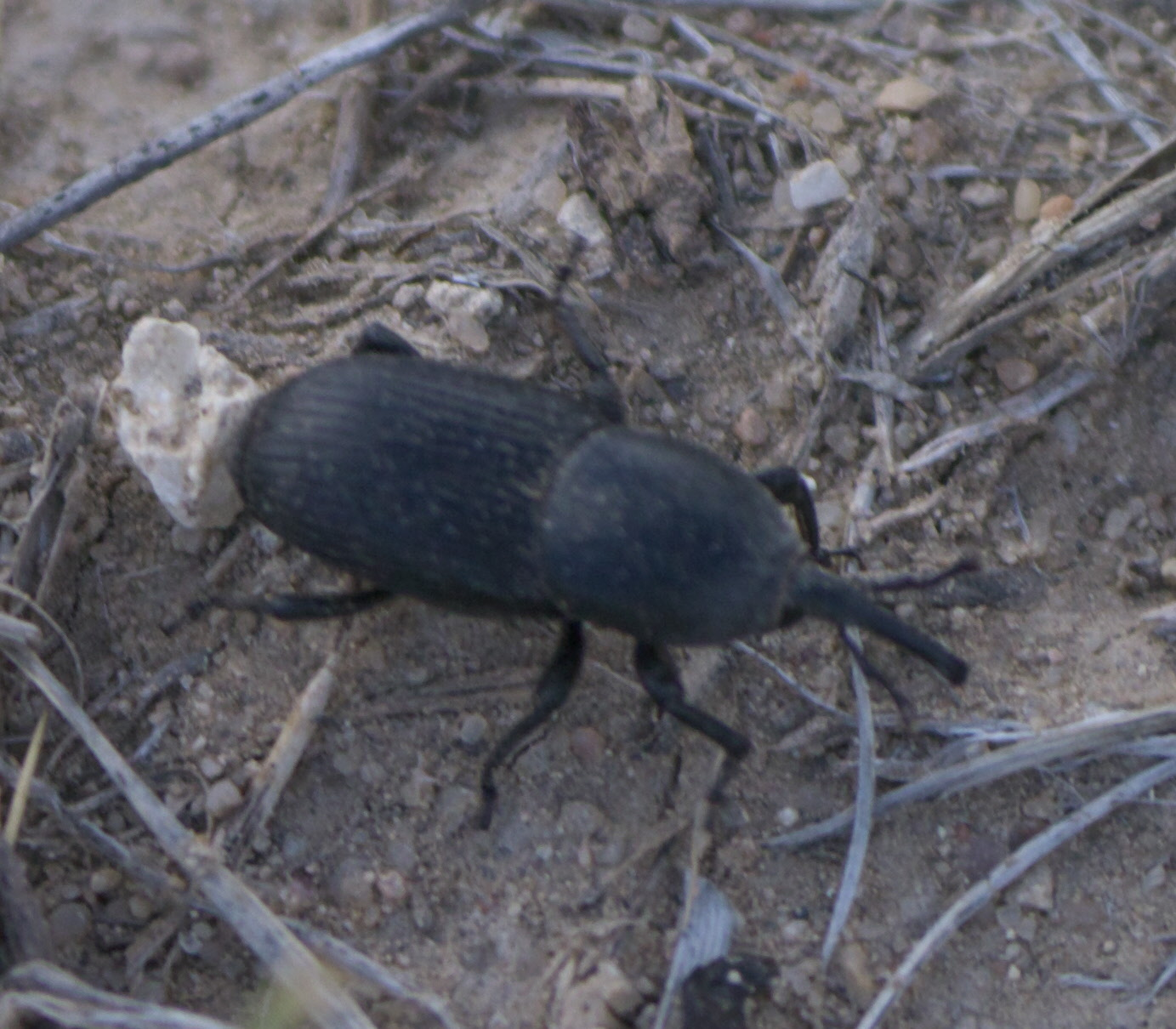

== Species ==
These 7 species belong to the genus Scyphophorus:

- Scyphophorus acupunctatus Gyllenhal, 1838 (sisal weevil)
- Scyphophorus fahraei Champion & G.C., 1910
- Scyphophorus fossionis Scudder, 1893
- Scyphophorus lacordairei Chevrolat & L.A.A., 1882
- Scyphophorus laevis Scudder, 1893
- Scyphophorus tertiarius Wickham & H.F., 1911
- Scyphophorus yuccae Horn, 1873
