= Fique =

Species of plant

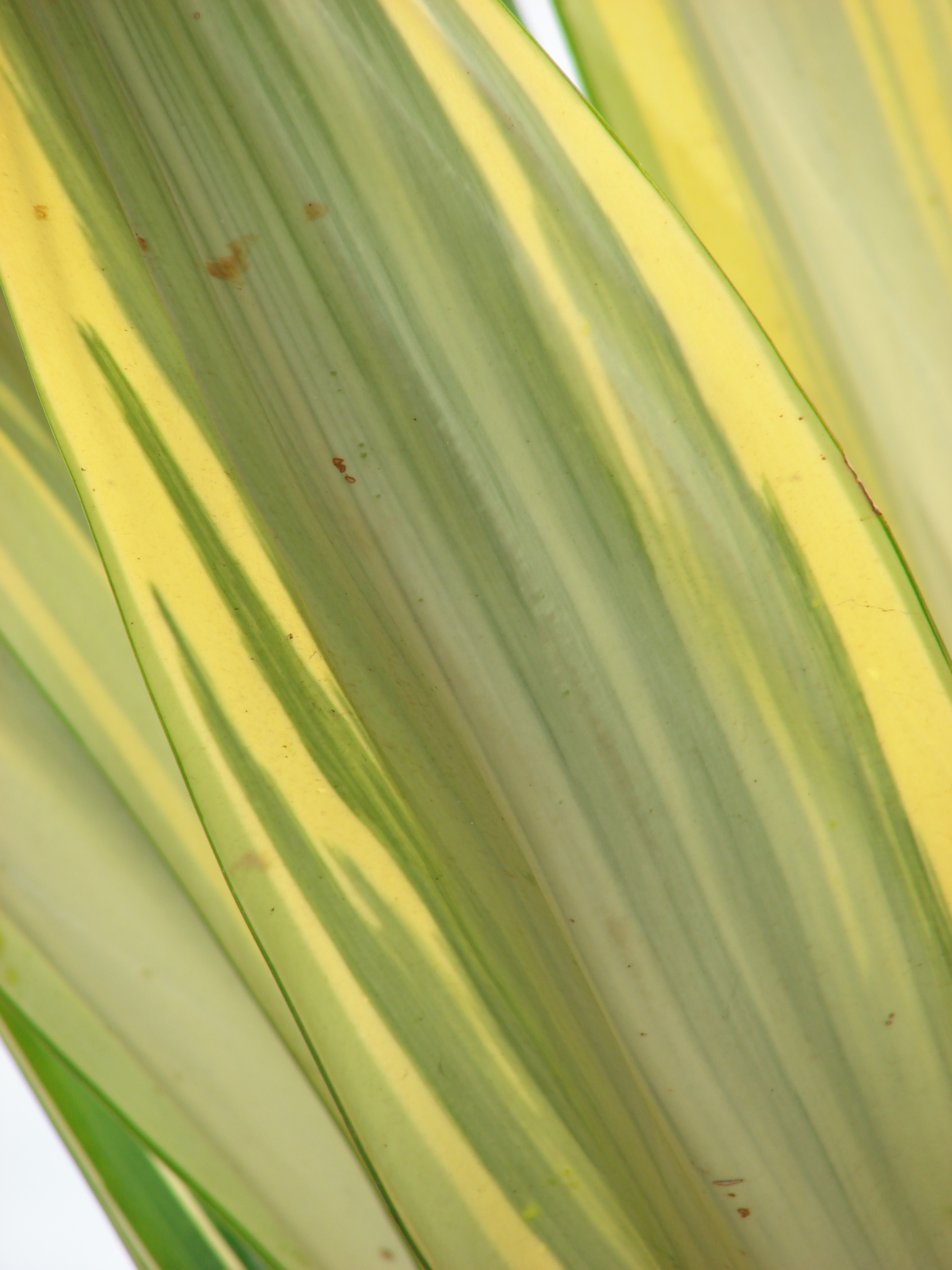
Fique fibers are obtained from the leaves of Furcraea plants

Fique is a natural fibre that grows in the leaves of plants in the genus Furcraea. Common names include fique, cabuya, pita, penca, penco, maguey, cabui, chuchao and coquiza.

== History ==
The Indigenous peoples of the Americas extracted and used the fique fibers to make garments, ropes, and hammocks—among other things—for several centuries before the arrival of Spanish conquerors.

In the 17th century, Dutch colonists carried the plant from their Brazilian colonies in Pernambuco to the island of Mauritius. The native inhabitants of the island learned to use the fibre and called it caraguatá-acú, croatá-acu or gravatá-acú, its Portuguese names.

The fibre was also introduced to St. Helena, India, Sri Lanka, Algeria, Madagascar, East Africa, Mexico and Costa Rica.

In the 18th century, in Dagua, Valle del Cauca, Colombia, the priest Feliciano Villalobos started the first rope and wrapping materials manufacturing industry; his products were made of fique. In 1880, the Colombian government reported a yearly production of three million kilograms of fibres, the exportation of 200,000 kilograms to Venezuela, and the fabrication of five million pairs of alpargatas, 300,000 pairs of sacks and four million metres of rope.

Between 1970 and 1975, the fique industry suffered a crisis brought about by the development of polypropylene, which costs less and is produced faster.

Today, fique is considered the Colombian national fibre and is used in the fabrication of ethnic products, Colombian handicrafts and, since July 2007, has been used for the heat protectors, handmade in Barichara, that are placed around cups of the Colombian coffeesold in Juan Valdez coffee shops worldwide.

== Uses ==
- Packing: The main use of the Colombian cabuya is for the fabrication of sacks and packages for agriculture. Based on the number of threads, the products are classified as:
  - Dense: 6000 to 10,000 threads per square metre. Used for flour and small grains such rice.
  - Semidense: 4800 to 5500. Used for bigger grains such coffee and beans.
  - Loose: 300 to 360. Used for fruits, vegetables and panela.
- Ropes: with cabuya, one can make very resistant ropes and strings of different calibres, from threads to manilas one inch in diameter. Such ropes are used in the transportation, construction, agricultural and sailing industries, amongst others.
- Arriería accessories: many of the elements used in the pack animals, such as enjalmas, cinchas, retrancas, lazos, pretales, tapa de enjalma, and cinchos are handmade with fique.
- Tapestry: the mixed and crude cabuya is used in rugs and tapestries of different size and quality. The fibres can be stained with different organic materials, such as avocado seed, achiote and eucalyptus cortex.
- Others: handcrafts, purses, bags, handbags, mattresses, curtains, shoes, umbrellas, baskets and many other products.

=== Subproducts ===
- Pulp: Used to produce organic fertilizer and paper.
- Leaf juice: Can be used for fabrication of soap, fungicides, alcoholic beverages (homemade tapetusa), organic fuel and animal food.
- Floral stem: The strong floral stem of the fique plant is used in the construction of houses and ladders.
- Bulbs: The pickled terminal bulbs of the plant are edible.
- Medicinal uses: Peasants use the leaves in topic preparations for treatment of boils. The extract of leaves is used against horse lice.

== Cultivation ==
Fique can be obtained from several species of Furcraea, such as F. macrophylla, F. cabuya, F. andina, and F. castilla. Depending on the processing of the fiber and the species used, many varieties of fique fibers can be obtained.

=== Main varieties ===
- Castilla (golden border)
- Ceniza (ash-colored)
- Espinosa (rough texture)
- Uña de águila (eagle nail)

=== Secondary varieties ===
- Cabuya verde (green)
- Chachagueña
- Espadilla
- Genoia
- Jardineña
- Negra común (black common)
- Rabo de chucha (opossum tail)
- Tunosa común (common spiked)

Optimal conditions for the growing of the fique plant are:

- Temperature: 19 to 23 °C (66 to 73 °F)
- Altitude: 1,300 to 1,900 m (4,300 to 6,200 ft)
- Annual rainfall: 1,000 mm – 1,600 mm
- Relative humidity: between 50 and 70%,
- Sunlight: 5–6 hours/day
- Soil: dry, rich in silicates, pH between 5.5 and 7.0.

Fique crops bring nitrogen to the soil, improving its fertility. The plant is very adaptable to different ecological conditions. A fique plant can produce 1 to 6 kg (2.2 to 13.2 lb) of fiber each year.

== Diseases ==
- Llaga macana or rayadilla: a viral disease that attacks most varieties of fique and all the parts of the plant, especially in crops over 1,900 m (6,200 ft) in altitude. The disease has no chemical control and must be managed with preventive measures.
- Pink disease: caused by the fungus corticium salmonicolor. The disease damages the leaves, disrupting the fibers. Treatment is undertaken with copper-based fungicides. Peasants treat this disease by applying ashes to the base of the leaves.
- Diaspis bromelia: a parasitic insect that has evolved to attack fique.
- Scyphophorus acupunctatus: a beetle that perforates the base of the leaves.
