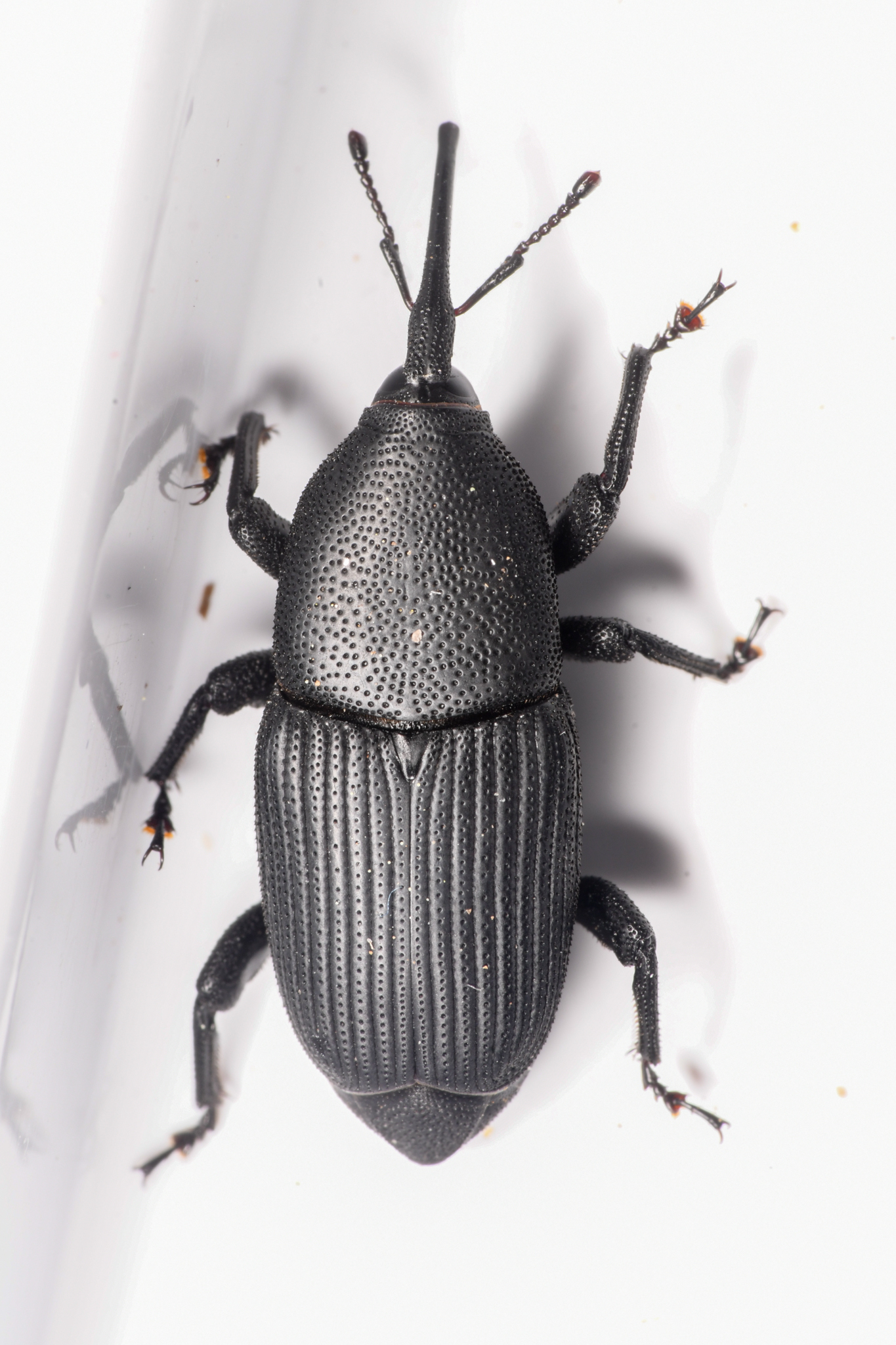

Scientific classification
- Domain: Eukaryota
- Kingdom: Animalia
- Phylum: Arthropoda
- Class: Insecta
- Order: Coleoptera
- Suborder: Polyphaga
- Infraorder: Cucujiformia
- Family: Curculionidae
- Genus: Scyphophorus
- Species: S. yuccae

Binomial name
- Scyphophorus yuccae Horn, 1873

= Scyphophorus yuccae =

Species of beetle

Scyphophorus yuccae, also known as the yucca weevil, is a species of beetle in the family Dryophthoridae. It is found in North America. Its host plant is the chaparral yucca, Hesperoyucca whipplei.
