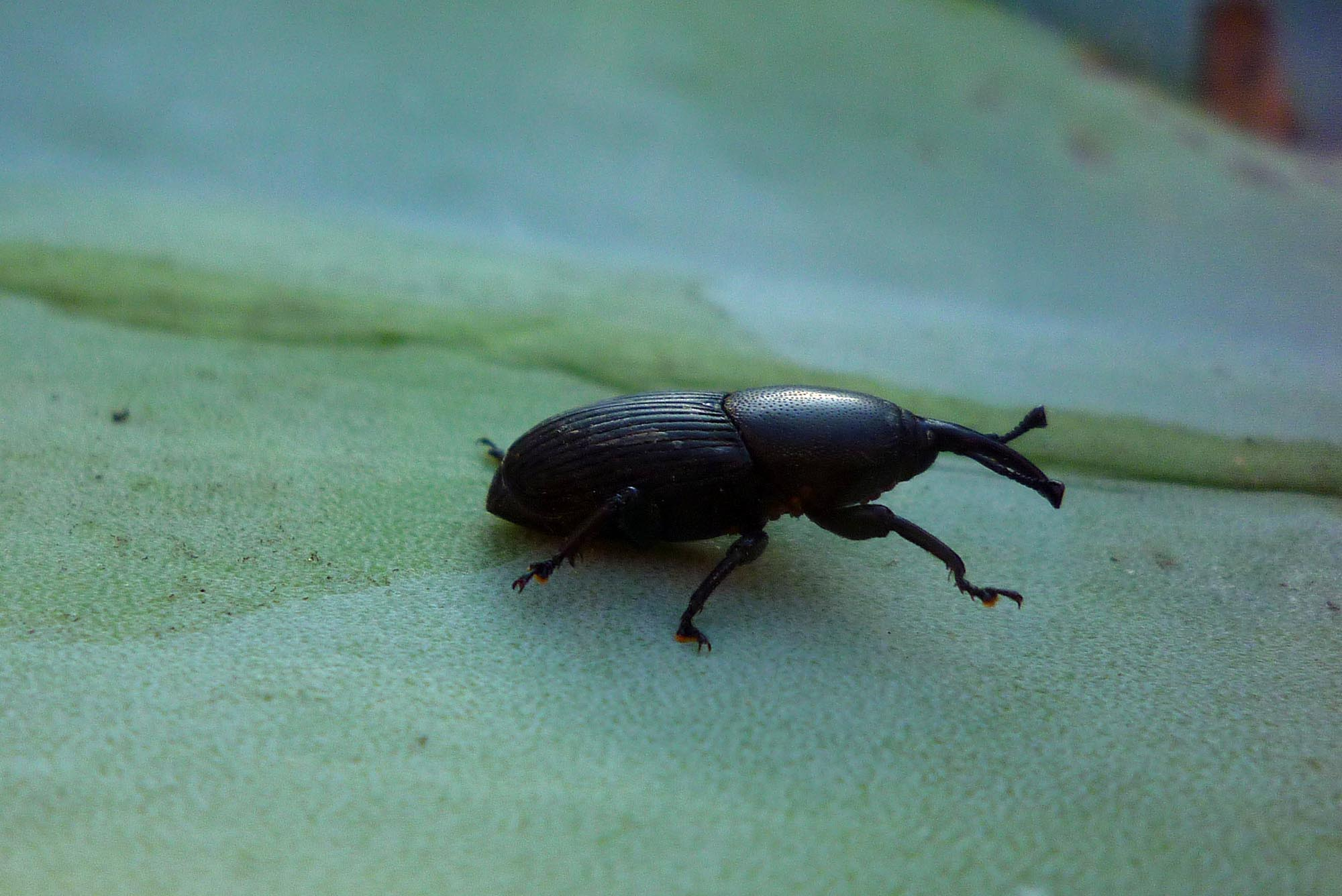

Scientific classification
- Kingdom: Animalia
- Phylum: Arthropoda
- Class: Insecta
- Order: Coleoptera
- Suborder: Polyphaga
- Infraorder: Cucujiformia
- Family: Curculionidae
- Genus: Scyphophorus
- Species: S. acupunctatus

Binomial name
- Scyphophorus acupunctatus Gyllenhaal, 1838

Synonyms
- Rhyncophorus asperulus LeConte, 1857; Scyphophorus asperulus Csiki & E., 1936; Scyphophorus anthracinus Gyllenhal, 1838; Scyphophorus interstitialis Gyllenhal, 1838; Scyphophorus robustior Horn, 1873

= Scyphophorus acupunctatus =

Species of beetle

Scyphophorus acupunctatus, the sisal weevil or agave weevil, is a species of polyphaga beetle of the family of the Curculionidae. Sisal weevil larvae, known as picudo del agave or "nixtamal worms", are a traditional food in parts of Mexico.

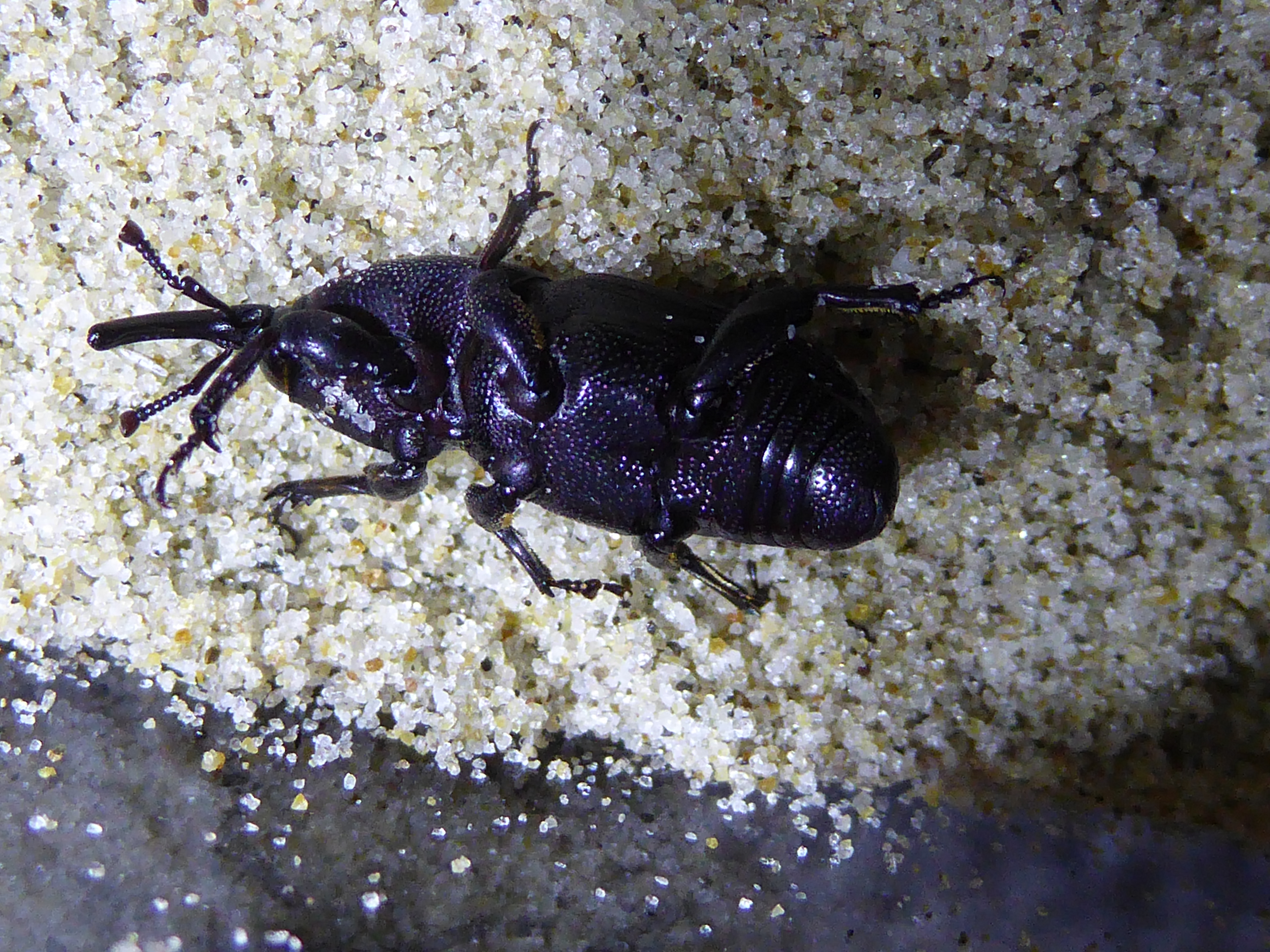
Sisal weevil, struggling to get up

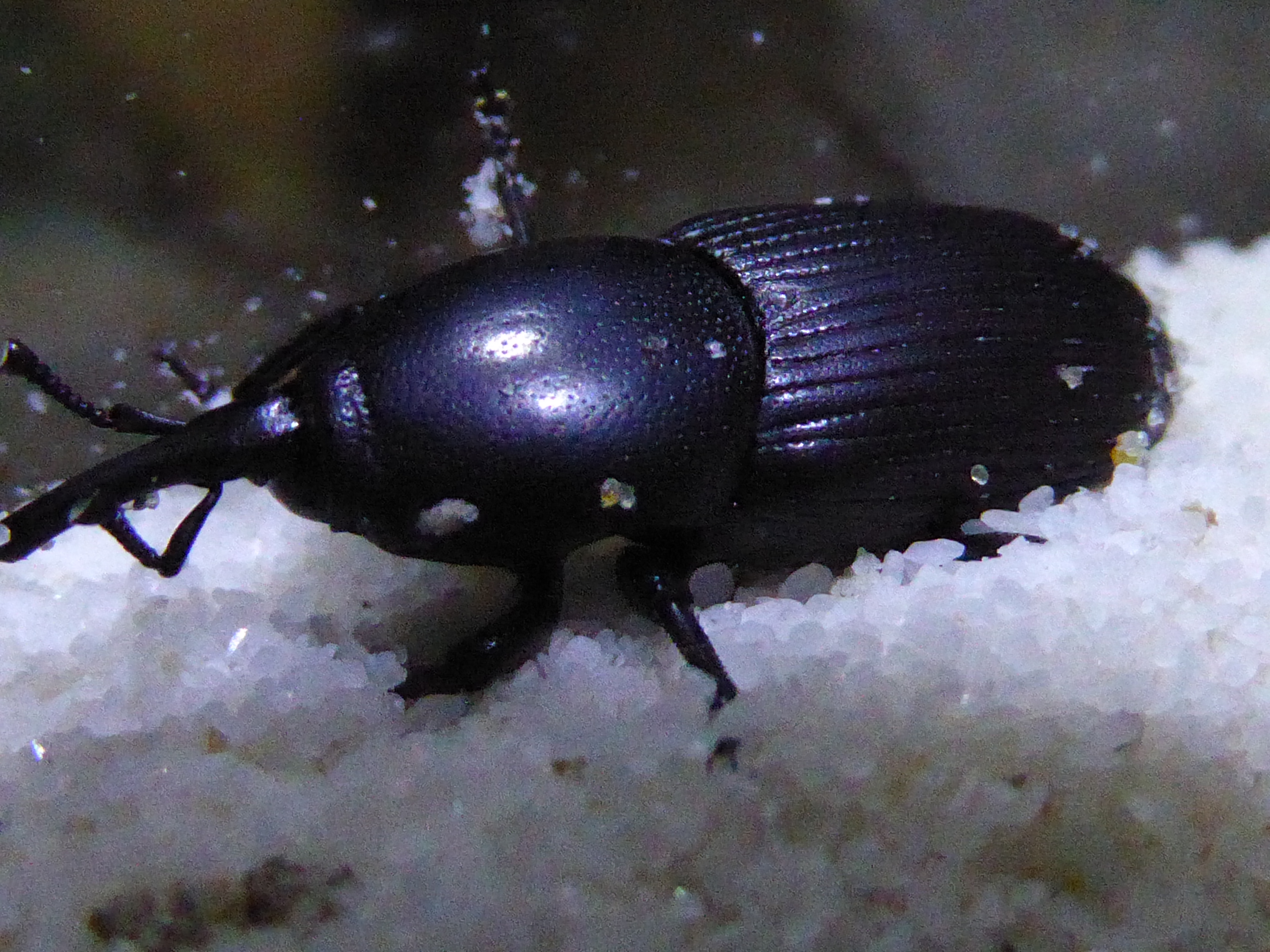
Sisal weevil

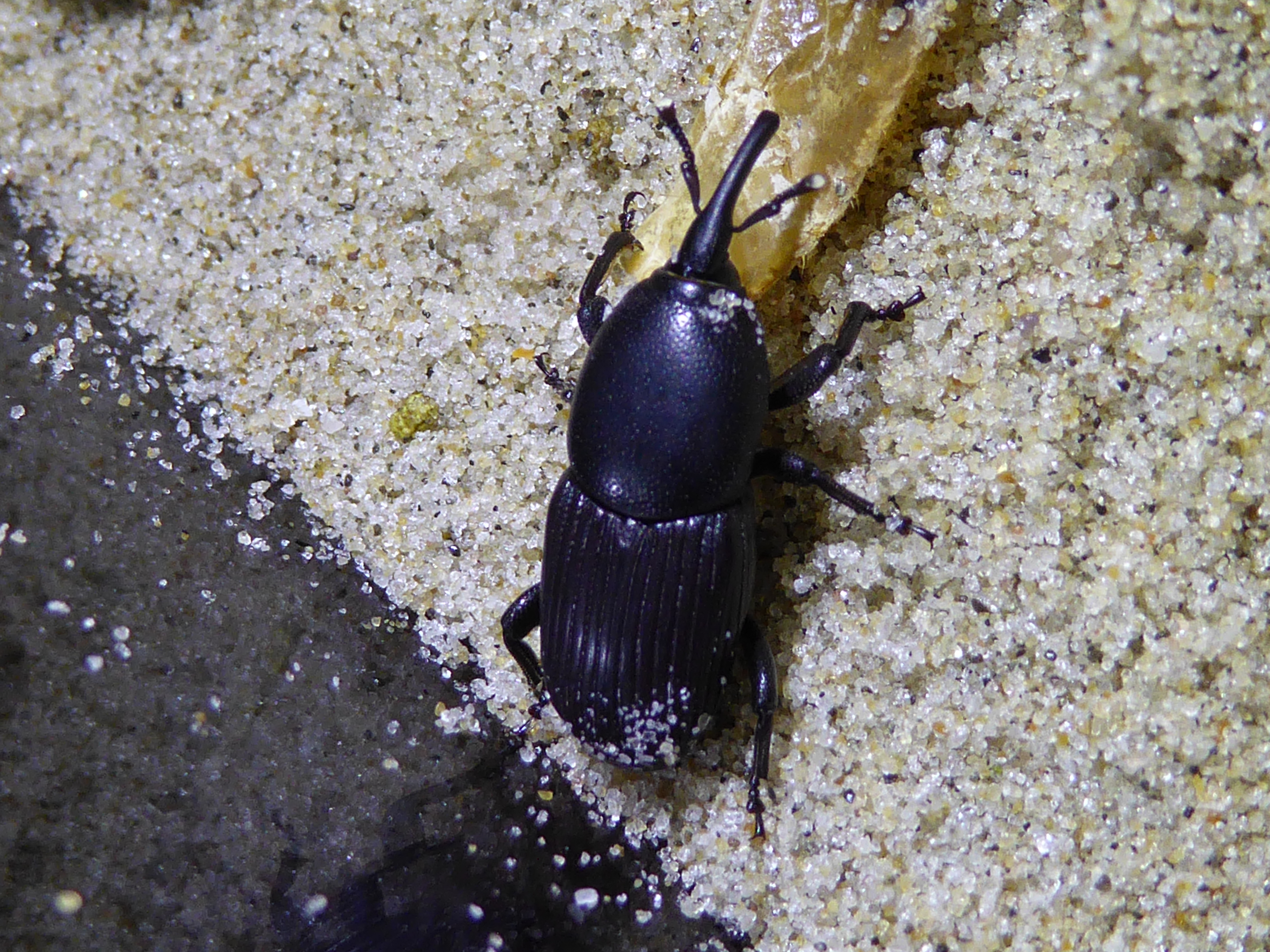
Sisal weevil, found in the White Sands Monument in New Mexico
