= Spheconisca =

Scientific classification
- Domain: Eukaryota
- Kingdom: Fungi
- Division: Ascomycota
- Class: Eurotiomycetes
- Order: Verrucariales
- Family: Verrucariaceae
- Genus: Spheconisca (Norman) Norman (1876)

Synonyms
- Moriola subdiv. Sphenconisca Norman (1872)

Genus of lichens

Spheconisca is a genus of lichen-forming fungi in the family Verrucariaceae. It has about 20 species. The genus, first proposed as a subdivision of Moriola in 1872 by Johannes M. Norman was promoted by him to generic status four years later, but without assigning a type species.
