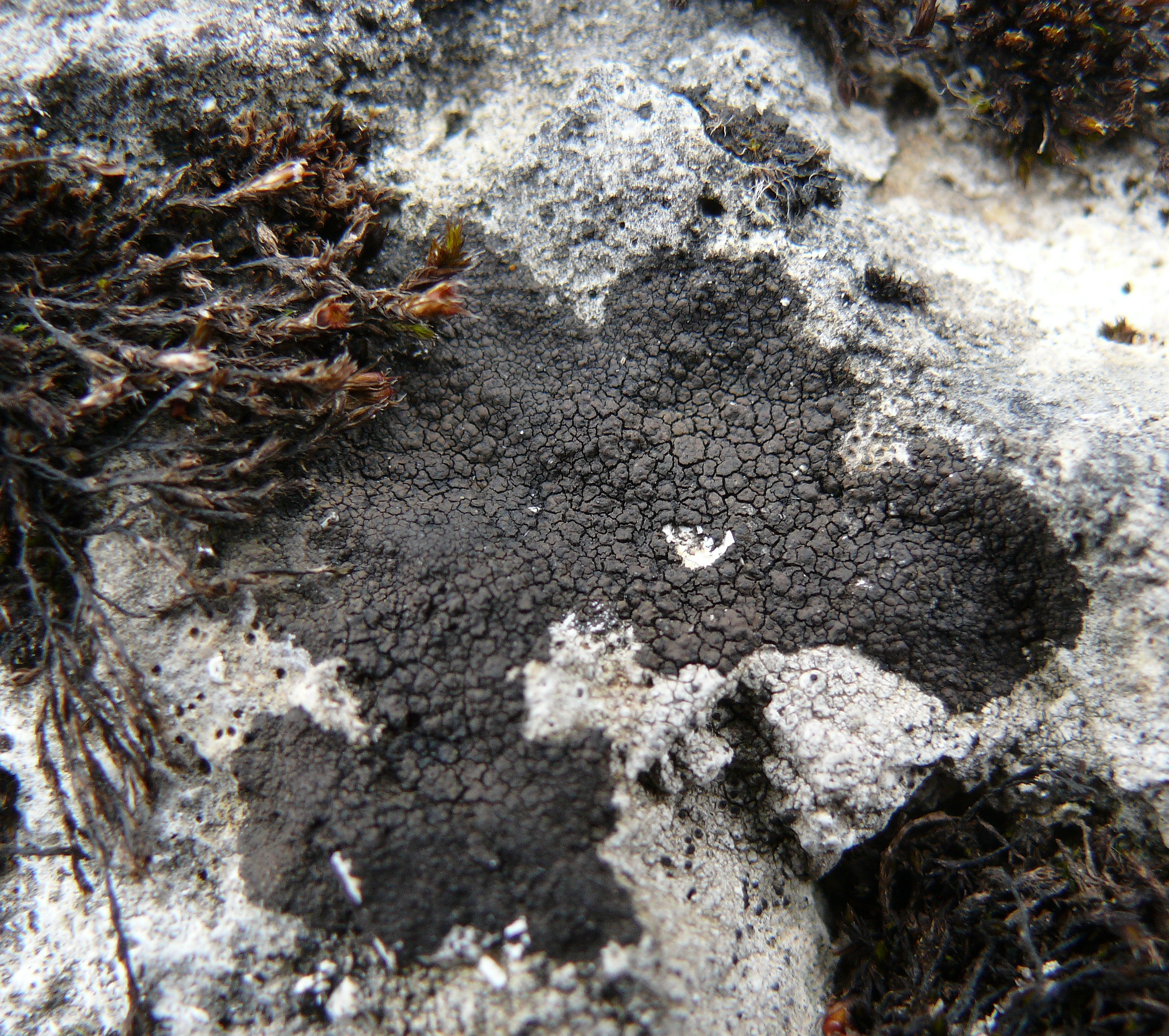
- Verrucaria nigrescens

Scientific classification
- Kingdom: Fungi
- Division: Ascomycota
- Class: Eurotiomycetes
- Order: Verrucariales
- Family: Verrucariaceae; Zenker (1827)

Type genus
- Verrucaria Shrad. (1794)

Genera
- See text

Synonyms
- List: Bagliettoaceae Servít (1954); Dermatocarpaceae Stizenb. (1862); Endocarpaceae Fée ex Zenker (1828); Endopyreniaceae Zahlbr. (1898); Glomerillaceae Norman (1868); Mastodiaceae Zahlbr. (1908); Pyrenothamniaceae Zahlbr. (1898); Staurotheleaceae Servít (1954); Thelidiaceae Walt.Watson (1929)

= Verrucariaceae =

Family of mostly lichenised fungi

The Verrucariaceae are a family of lichens and a few non-lichenised fungi in the order Verrucariales. The lichens have a wide variety of thallus forms, from crustose (crust-like) to foliose (bushy) and squamulose (scaly). Most of them grow on land, some in freshwater and a few in the sea. Many are free-living but there are some species that are parasites on other lichens, while one marine species always lives together with a leafy green alga.

Several characteristics of the spore-bearing structures, the ascomata, define the family, including their perithecioid form–more or less spherical or flask-shaped, with a single opening and otherwise completely enclosed by a wall. Squamulose members of the Verrucariaceae with simple ascospores (lacking partitions called septa), and without algae in the spore-bearing region are known as catapyrenioid lichens; there are more than 80 of these species. The family has several dozen lichenicolous (lichen-dwelling) examples, including a few genera that contain solely lichenicolous members. An unusually diverse variety of photobiont partners have been recorded, mostly green algae, but also brown algae and yellow-green algae.

The family, circumscribed nearly two centuries ago, now includes 56 genera and about one thousand species, and is the third-largest family of lichen-forming fungi. Most diversity occurs in temperate climates of the Northern Hemisphere. Rocks and soil are the most common substrates for the Verrucariaceae, with growth on wood, bark, and leaves less common. Several species are components of biological soil crusts and contribute to the formation and stabilisation of soil. Some semi-aquatic lichens occur in this family, including about two dozen species of marine lichens. Traditionally, Verrucariaceae species have been grouped into genera based largely on the growth form of the thallus, and on the septation of the spores. Molecular phylogenetics research conducted in the past couple of decades has helped to clarify the phylogenetic framework of the family, but many genera remain poorly investigated.

== Systematics ==
=== Taxonomic history ===
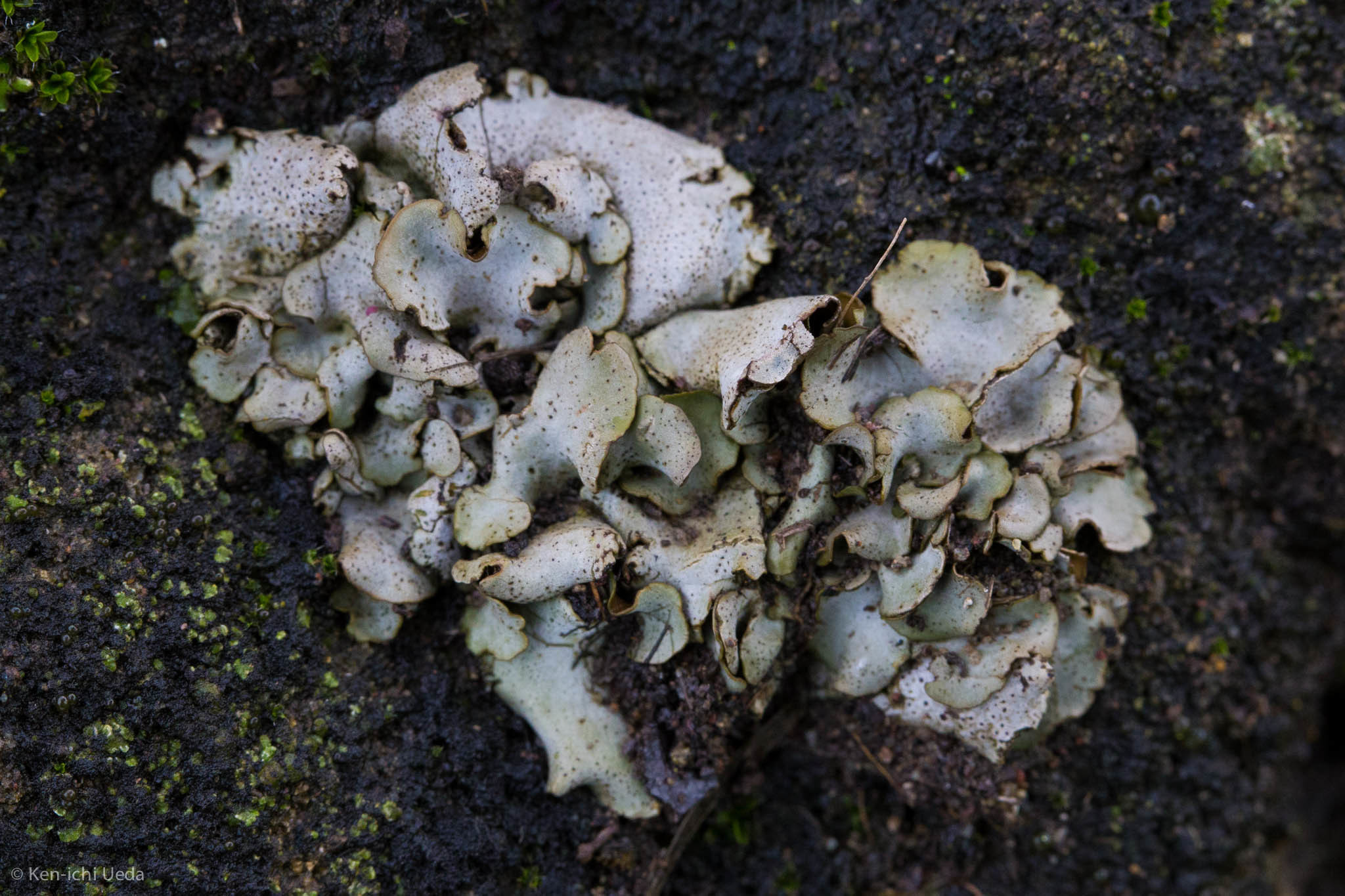
Dermatocarpon americanum is a foliose member of the Verrucariaceae ...

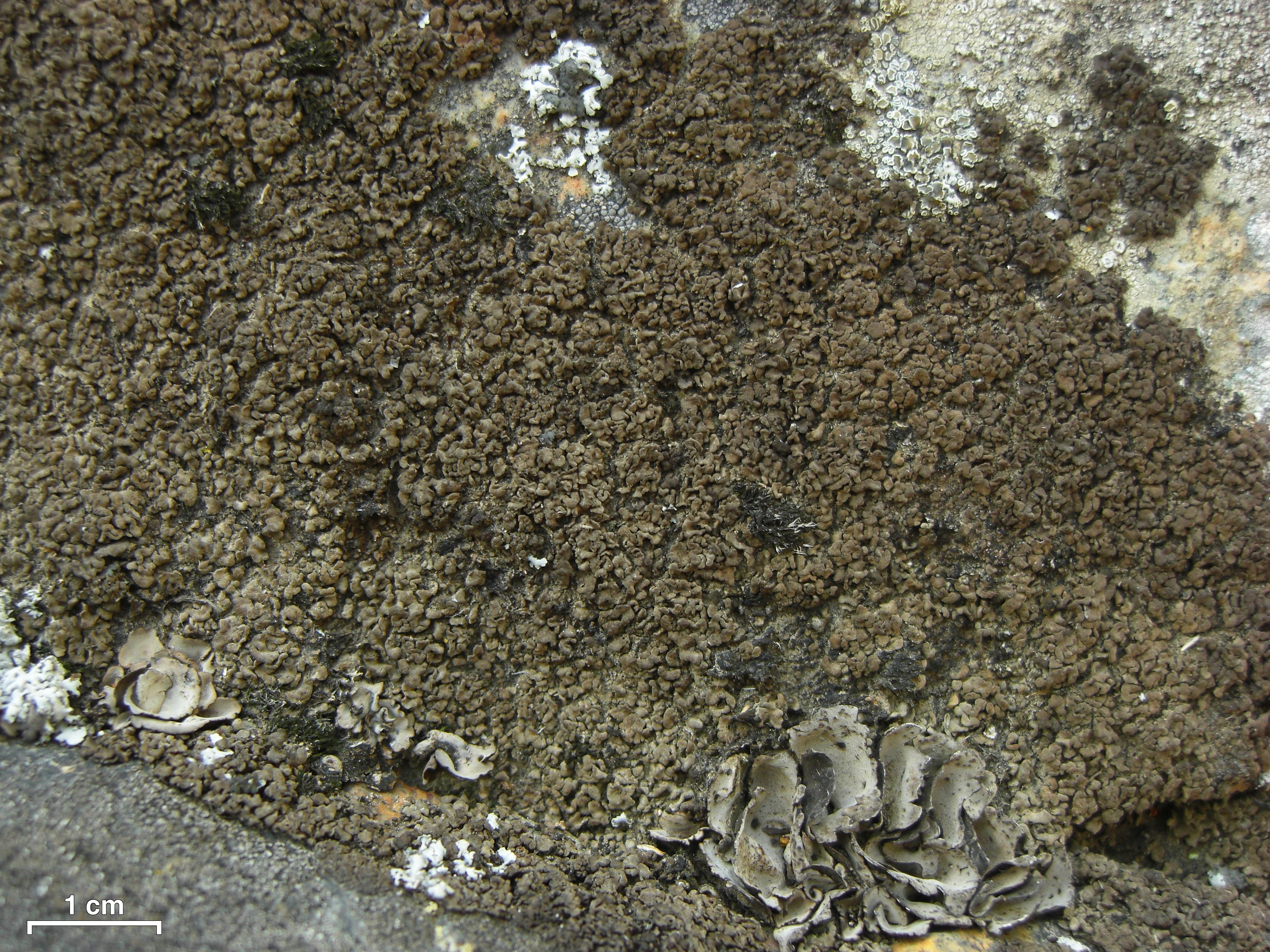
... while Staurothele pulvinata is squamulose.

A system of classification for the Verrucariaceae was first suggested by German botanist Franz Gerhard Eschweiler in 1824. In his scheme, taxa were distributed between two taxonomic ranks intended as names of orders ("cohors"), the Dermatocarpeae and the Verrucariae, based on thallus structure. The Dermatocarpeae contained squamulose (scaly) and foliose (leafy) species, while the Verrucariae had the crustose species. Although several genera were included in each cohor, most of these are now known to be not closely related and are classified in other families; the only currently applicable genera from Eschweiler's list are Dermatocarpon and Endocarpon in the Dermatocarpeae, and Verrucaria in the Verrucariae. Because Eschweiler published these taxa as "cohors", they do not meet the requirements of valid publication according to nomenclatural rules, and the authorship of the family cannot be attributed to him. The family was validly published by Jonathan Carl Zenker three years later in 1827 (as Verrucariae), with Verrucaria assigned as the type genus. In Zenker's proposed classification, the family was divided into Cryolichenes (Verrucariae), which contained Verrucaria and other unrelated crustose genera, and Phyllolichenes (Endocarpa), with genus Endocarpon representing the squamulose and foliose taxa.

Nearly a century later, Alexander Zahlbruckner's publication Catalogus Lichenum Universalis (1922) became an influential work for lichen classification. He divided the order Verrucariales into two families, Dermatocarpaceae and Verrucariaceae, the latter of which was divided into 13 genera, 9 of which remain in the family. Around this time, German lichenologist Georg Hermann Zschacke contributed the first extensive monographic series on the family in a set of publications from 1913 to 1927. His classification scheme was similar to that of Zahlbruckner.

Historically, there were three main morphological criteria used to separate genera in the Verrucariaceae: spore septation (the degree of partitioning by septa); the structure of the thallus; and the presence or absence of algae in the spore-bearing tissue, the hymenium. However, even before the advent of molecular phylogenetics, the use of these characters have been contentious, as several authors have considered them artificial, and not representative of true phylogenetic relationships. As one example, the use of the degree of spore septation as a major character to circumscribe genera was shown to be problematic when it was demonstrated that in some instances, spore septation is variable with a single species. In 1953, Czech lichenologist Miroslav Servít proposed a new system of classification for the Verrucariaceae, based largely on characteristics of the involucrellum—the upper, often pigmented, part of the fruiting body covering the perithecia. Josef Halda summarised Servít's contribution: "Servít's studies contributed to complicacy of the taxonomy of the whole order Verrucariales. The huge amount of newly described taxa (families, genera, species, varieties or forms) and new combinations almost brought an end to good orientation necessary for new researchers. Any of his studies is not really a revision since it contains only a further list of new taxa and their combinations within the many genera and family framework. Servít neither returned to his newly described taxa nor he revised them in his monographs". Servít's classification was not widely adopted by future authors, and according to Cécile Gueidan and colleagues, it was the lack of clear morphological characteristics in the Verrucariaceae that hindered future proposals for changes in classification.

Because of the relatively simple morphology of most of the crustose Verrucariaceae (especially in the type genus Verrucaria), and the fact that this morphology is often variable depending on environmental conditions, identification and delimitation of the species in this family is difficult. Many morphological traits are symplesiomorphic or homoplastic, and are not suitable as distinguishing characters to define genera. Studies have demonstrated several examples of cryptic species–genetically distinct lichens that are difficult or impossible to distinguish by morphology alone–in the genera Hydropunctaria, Sporodictyon, and Verrucaria. These difficulties are reflected in the number of species of uncertain status described by previous lichenologists: of the 84 Verrucariaceae species described by Zahlbruckner, about 37 are currently accepted as valid species; Zschacke described 133 species, of which about 50 are now accepted; of Servít's 424 described species, only about 60 are accepted.

=== Molecular phylogenetics ===
- - - Placocarpus
    - Verrucula
  - - Wahlenbergiella
    - - - - - Bagliettoa
            - Parabagliettoa
          - - - - - Placidium
                  - Heteroplacidium
                - Dermatocarpon
              - - Endocarpon, Neocatapyrenium
                - - - - Polyblastia
                      - Thelidium
                    - - - Atla
                        - Sporodictyon
                      - - Henrica
                        - Verrucaria
                  - Trimmatothele
            - - Placopyrenium
              - Verruculopsis
        - Hydropunctaria
      - - - - Catapyrenium
            - Placidiopsis
          - Staurothele
        - Staurothele group

Cladogram (highly simplified from the original) showing the phylogeny of the main genera in family Verrucariaceae.

The first molecular phylogenetic studies involving the Verrucariaceae, published between 2001 and 2006, were used to show the higher-level relationships in the Eurotiomycetes. This research showed that Verrucariales has a sister relationship to the Chaetothyriales, an order of non-lichenised fungi. In 2007 and 2009 publications, Cécile Gueidan and colleagues used molecular data from 83 Verrucariaceae taxa to demonstrate that many of the morphologically defined genera were polyphyletic—of mixed evolutionary origins. In their analysis, they identified 4 major lineages in the family, including ten monophyletic subgroups. They proposed several taxonomic changes to more closely align the morphology-based classification with the molecular phylogeny, including the new genera Parabagliettoa, Hydropunctaria, and Wahlenbergiella and several new combinations. Ancestral state reconstruction analysis suggests that the most recent common ancestor of the Verrucariaceae was probably crustose, had a weakly differentiated upper cortex, a hymenium free of algae, and simple ascospores (i.e., without septa). The first lichen-forming fungus to have its genome sequenced was the mycobiont of Endocarpon pusillum, the type species of Endocarpon and a member of the Verrucariaceae.

=== Etymology ===
As is standard practice in botanical nomenclature, the name Verrucariaceae is based on the name of the type genus, Verrucaria, with the ending -aceae indicating the rank of family. The genus name is derived from the Latin word verruca (meaning "wart") and the suffix -aria (meaning "belonging to" or "possession").

=== Synonymy ===
Some genera now classified in the Verrucariaceae were considered by past authors to be distinctive enough to warrant inclusion in their own family. These historical family names are considered synonymous with Verrucariaceae:

- Endocarpaceae Fée ex Zenker (1828) – type genus: Endocarpon
- Dermatocarpaceae Stizenb. (1862) – type genus: Dermatocarpon
- Glomerillaceae Norman (1868) – type genus: Glomerilla
- Endopyreniaceae Zahlbr. (1898) – type genus: Endocarpon
- Mastodiaceae Zahlbr. (1908) – type genus: Mastodia
- Pyrenothamniaceae Zahlbr. (1898) – type genus: Pyrenothamnia Tuck. (1883), now synonymised with Endocarpon
- Thelidiaceae Walt.Watson (1929) – type genus: Thelidium
- Bagliettoaceae Servít (1954) – type genus: Bagliettoa
- Staurotheleaceae Servít (1954) – type genus: Staurothele

== Description ==
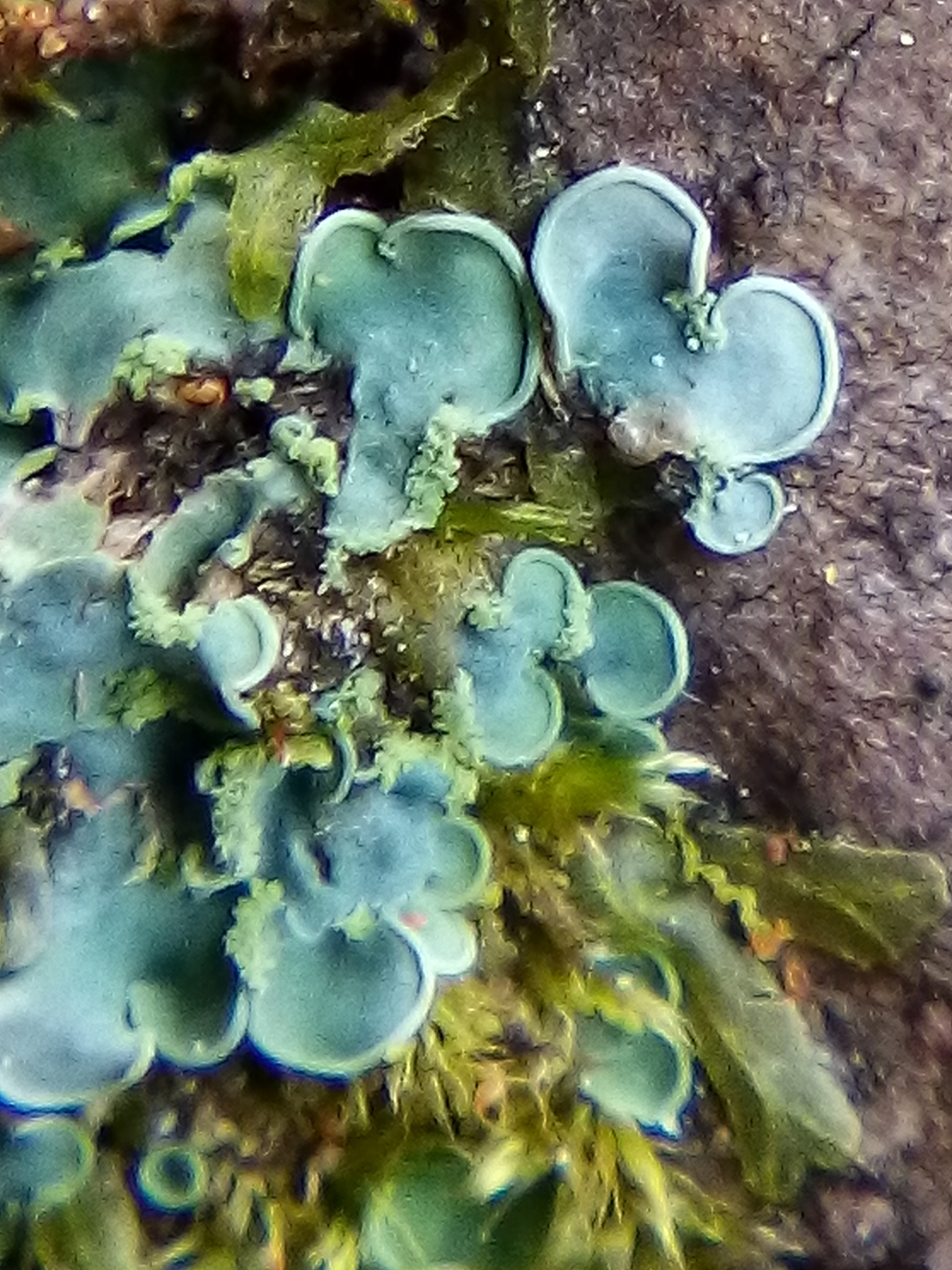
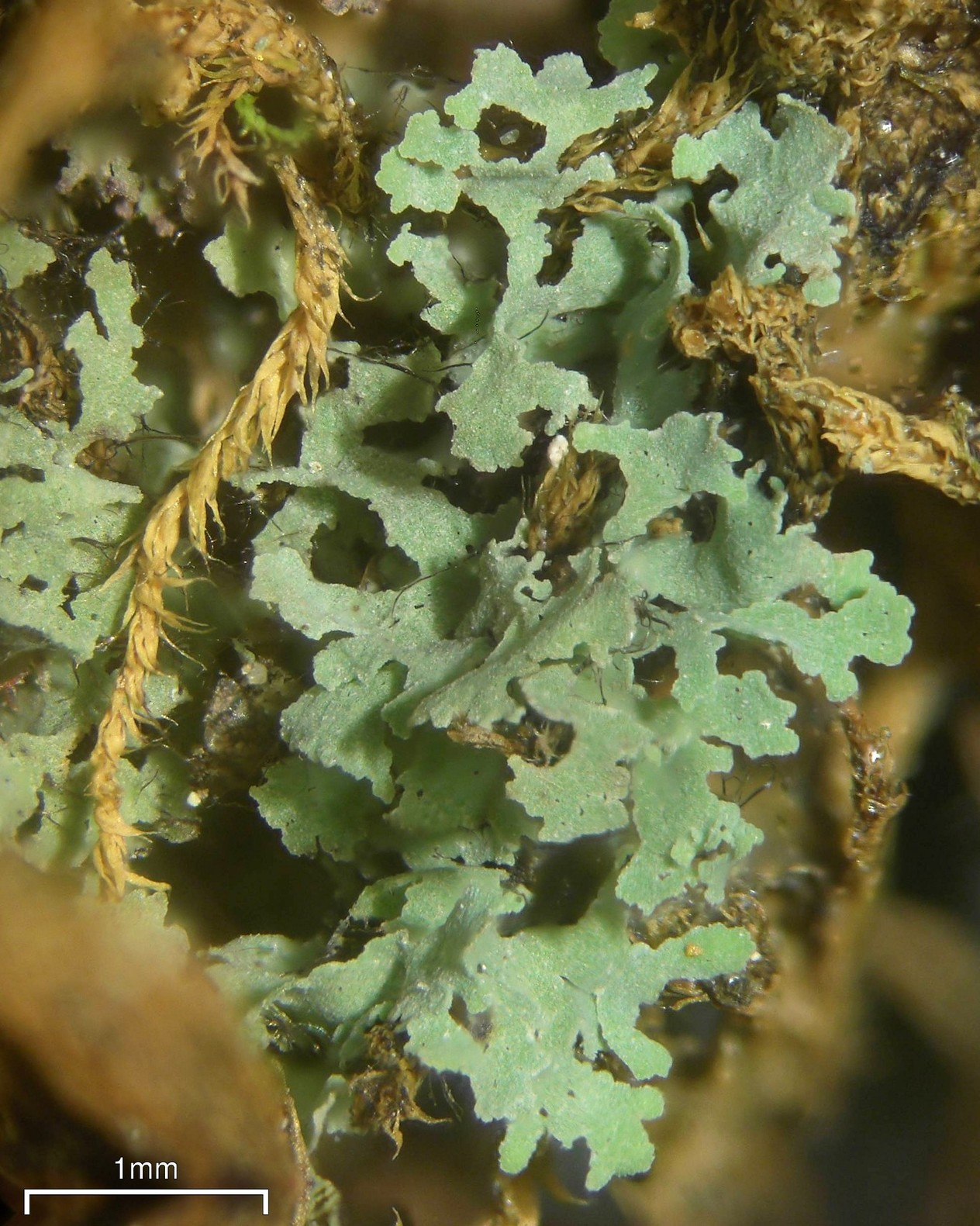
Normandina pulchella (left) and Flakea papillata (right) are two Verrucariaceae species with unusual thallus morphologies.

Species of Verrucariaceae occur in a wide variety of morphologies, including crustose, foliose, and squamulose forms. The size of the lichen body, or thallus, usually ranges from a few millimetres to about 10 cm (4 in) in diameter. Typical thallus colours are greenish, brownish, grey, or black. The medulla is the internal layer of fungal hyphae below the cortex and the algal layer; three types occur in the Verrucariaceae. The prosoplectenchymatous type has loosely interlaced hyphae with elongated cells, the paraplectenchymatous type comprises tightly arranged and rounded cells, and the mixed-type medulla has both rounded and elongated cells.

The ascomata are in the form of a perithecium, and these structures are often clypeate—meaning they have a shield-like stromatic growth, made of both fungal hyphae and host tissue, around the ostiole (opening). In these instances the involucrellum is typically well developed. The hamathecium is a term for all kinds of hyphae or other tissues between asci (the spore-bearing cells). In the Verrucariaceae, the hamathecium is evanescent (disappearing at maturity), and usually hemiamyloid (rarely amyloid). The perithecia have short pseudoparaphyses; these vertical, filament-like support structures are similar to paraphyses but grow downwards in the perithecial cavity before ascus formation. In two genera, Endocarpon and Staurothele, algal cells occur in the hamathecium. Asci are usually bitunicate, meaning they have two functional ascal wall layers. The release of spores from the ascus, or dehiscence, has been shown in some species to involve the gelification of the outer wall apex. The ascospores usually number eight per ascus, are variably septate, and often have a gelatinous covering.

There have been several publications investigating the anatomy and development of the perithecia in Verrucariaceae species. Despite this, it is not clear whether the development of ascomata in the family should be considered ascohymenial (formation originates from special hyphal branches that are usually enveloped by the hyphae that will form the ascocarp) or ascolocular (formation originates from a small stroma, and the asci develop in cavities whose wall consists of stromal tissue).

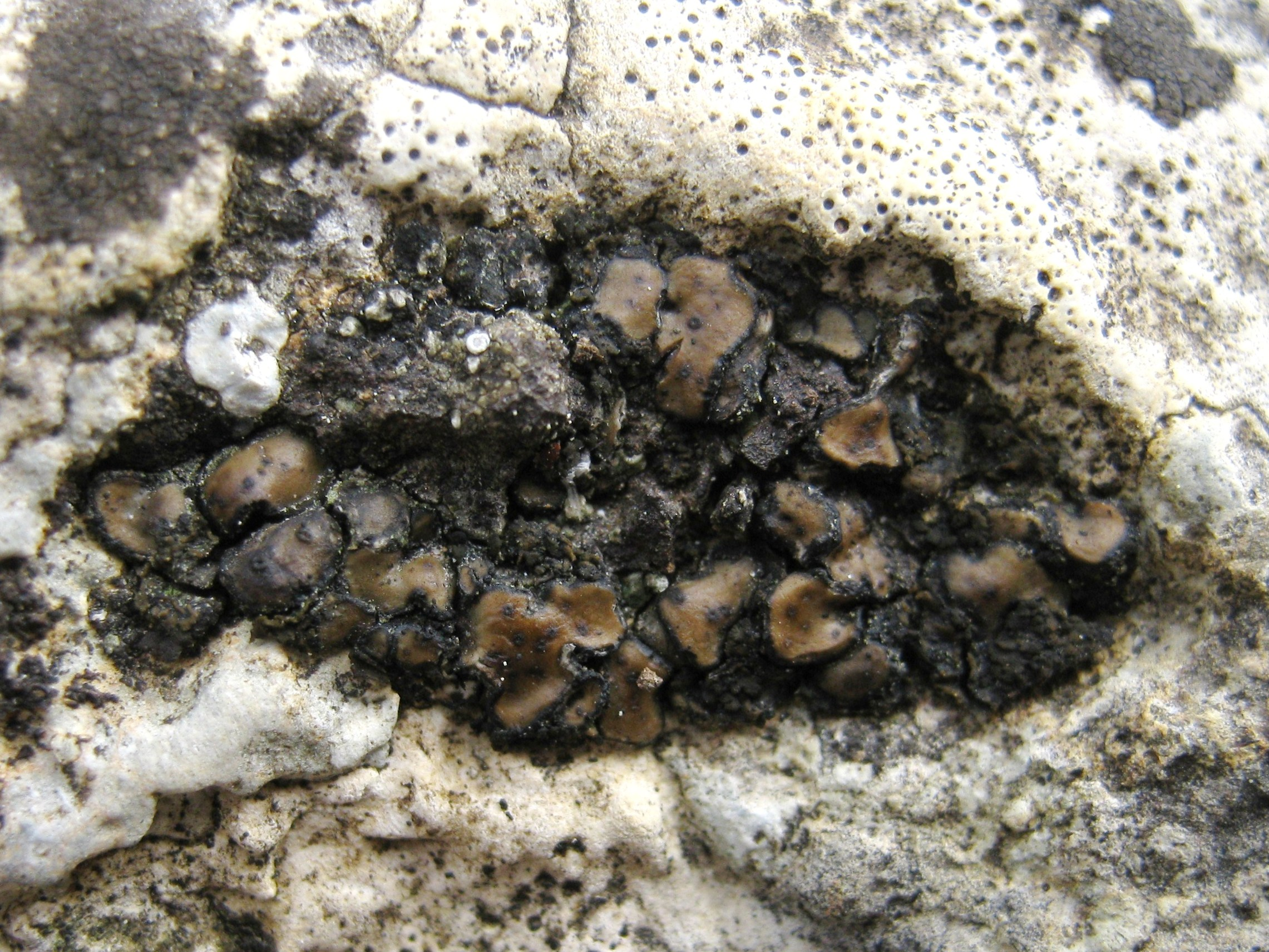
Catapyrenium boccanum, shown here growing in a hole in a calcareous rock, is a catapyrenioid lichen.

Members of the Verrucariaceae that are squamulose, have simple ascospores (without any septa), and lack algae in the hymenium were historically classified in the genus Catapyrenium. These species were later divided into several genera based on the structure of their pycnidia; the validity of this generic splitting was confirmed with phylogenetic analyses. The so-called "catapyrenioid" lichens include members of Anthracocarpon, Catapyrenium, Heteroplacidium, Involucropyrenium, Neocatapyrenium, Placidiopsis, Placidium, and Scleropyrenium, and, as of 2010, numbered 81 species.

The morphological variety of the thallus in the Verrucariaceae includes some rarely encountered forms. For example, the thallus of Flakea papillata consists of what has been described as "minute 'lawns' of small leaflets", in which the algae are arranged in a net-like structure of adjacent cells, one cell layer thick. In Psoroglaena stigonemoides, the thallus consists of tiny coral-like branches of algal threads that are covered by a layer of pimpled (papillate) fungal hyphae. In the sterile lichen Normandina pulchella, the thallus comprises small bluish-green squamules. These squamules have edges can extend upward to form structures similar in appearance to the basidiolichen species Lichenomphalia hudsoniana, or in other instances transform into soralia, somewhat resembling the leprose genus Lepraria.

== Photobionts ==
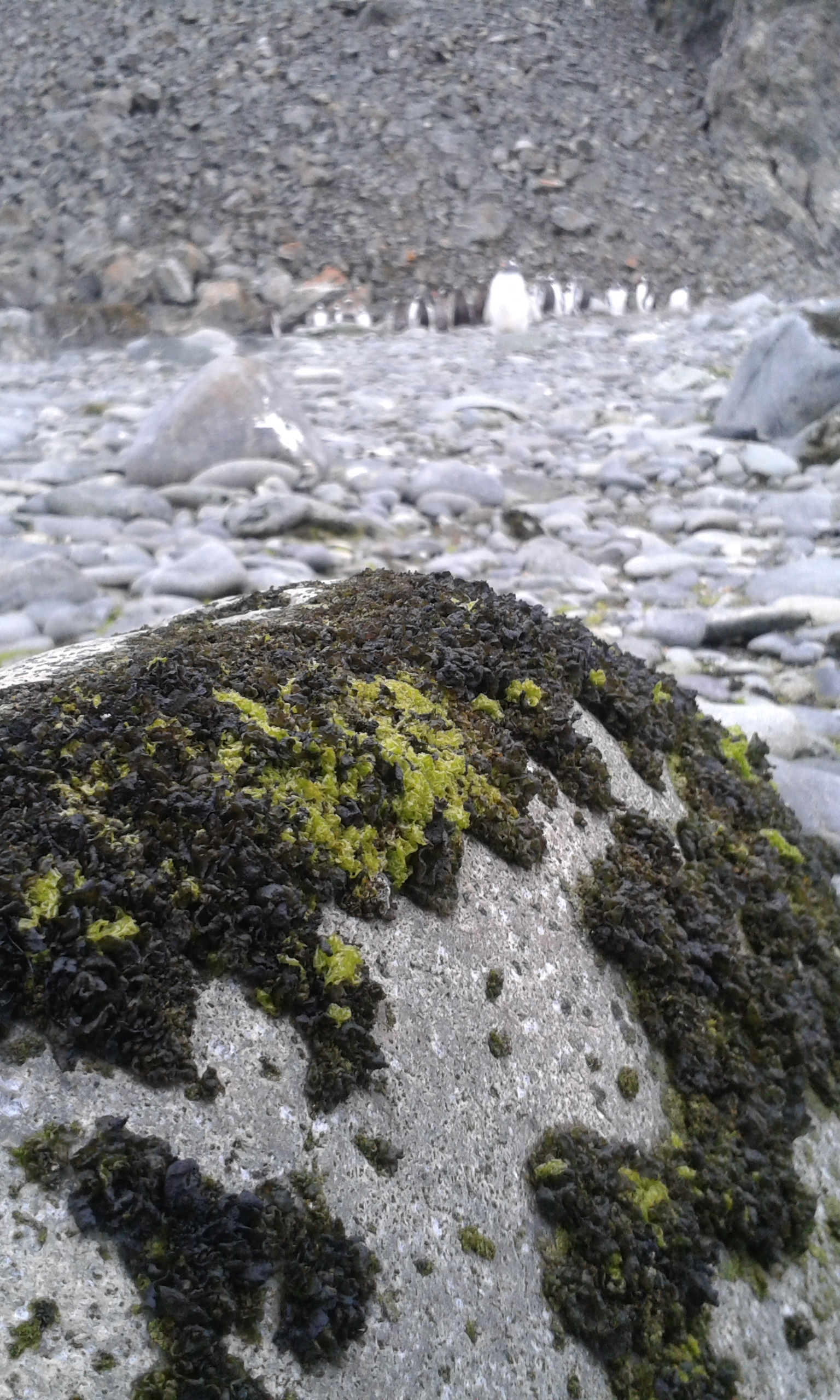
The marine species Mastodia tessellata (dark colour) is the only lichen known to form a symbiotic association with a foliose green alga.

There are several green algal genera that are known to become photobiont partners with Verrucariaceae mycobionts. The high photobiont diversity observed in this family is rather unusual, as most higher-level taxonomic groups of lichen-forming fungi tend to associate preferentially with only one or two groups of algae. Known green algal associates include members of the class Trebouxiophyceae (genera Asterochloris, Auxenochlorella, Chlorella, Chloroidium, Diplosphaera, Elliptochloris, Myrmecia, Pseudostichococcus, Trebouxia, and Trochiscia), class Chlorophyceae (genus Coccobotrys), and class Ulvophyceae (genus Dilabifilum). Research continues to reveal new symbiont relationships, such as the newly described (2022) green algal genus and species, Rindifilum ramosum (family Ctenocladaceae, order Ulvales), which associates with some members of Verrucaria.

One study of photobiont diversity in the Verrucariceae suggests that genera with simple crustose thalli (examples include Bagliettoa, Hydropunctaria, and Wahlenbergiella,) use a high diversity and unusual selection of photobionts, whereas the genera with more complex thalli (such as Placidium and Dermatocarpon) tend to have lower photobiont diversity. Brown algae are far less frequent photobiont partners for the Verrucariaceae. An example is the intertidal marine lichen formed by the fungus Wahlenbergiella tavaresiae and the brown alga Petroderma maculiforme. The free-living alga produces filaments that grow and branch upwards; when lichenised and surrounded by mycobiont tissue, they grow downwards. The Verrucariaceae is the only mostly lichen-forming family to have photobiont associations with yellow-green algae (class Xanthophyceae, genus Heterococcus). This genus was shown to be a photobiont partner in the thalli of three unrelated species of Verrucariaceae: Hydropunctaria rheitrophila, Verrucaria funckii, and V. hydrela. In 2022, a crustose, seashore-inhabiting member of the Verrucariaceae was reported as a mycobiont partner for the free-living macroscopic genus Urospora, the first time that genus, or even any in the order Ulotrichales, has been recorded as a photobiont.

The nature of the interaction between mycobiont and photobiont sometimes differs from the typical lichen arrangement in which the photobiont is embedded in a fungal tissue created by the mycobiont. In the Verrucariaceae, some lichens have thalloid algae, where the mycobiont grows within the independently formed algal thallus. Examples include the brown algae Pelvetia and Ascophyllum, and the green alga Prasiola crispa. This last species is the photobiont partner of Mastodia tessellata, the type species of genus Mastodia; this is the only known lichen symbiosis involving a foliose green alga. Because the fungus grows independently as mycelium in close contact with the algae, the interaction between Ascophyllum and verrucariacean fungi is not technically considered a lichen symbiosis. This type of biological partnership has been referred to as an "intimate, mutualistic association", or a mycophycobiosis; more generally, associated species with this type of loose symbiosis have been called "borderline lichens".

== Habitat, distribution, and ecology ==
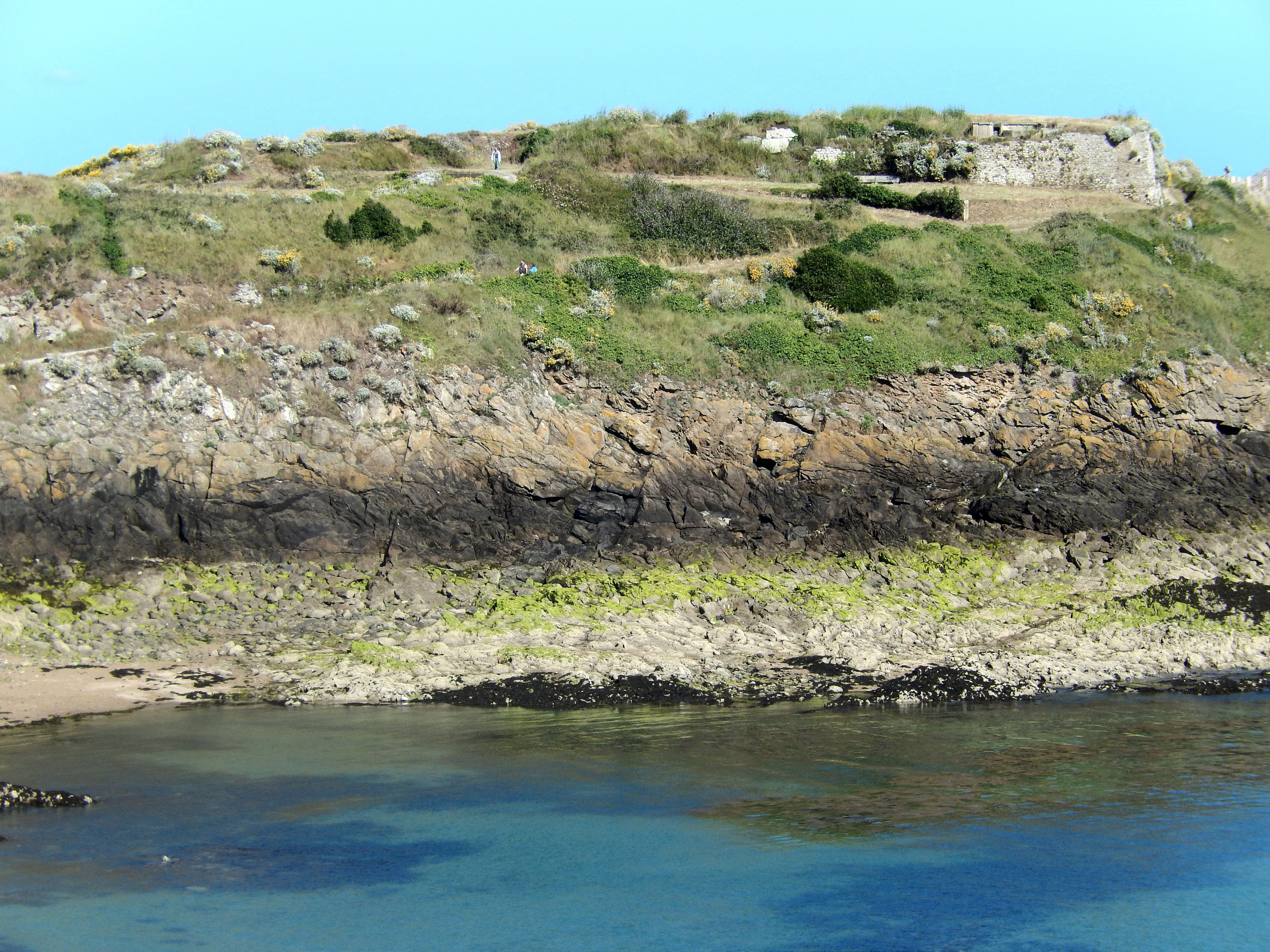
Hydropunctaria maura forming a stripe of black lichen (a vegetation zone) along the high-tide line in Saint-Malo, northwestern France

Collectively, Verrucariaceae has a cosmopolitan distribution, although the majority of its species occur in temperate climates. Rocks and soil are the most common substrates, with growth on wood and bark less common. Among the rock-dwelling species, there are both epiliths (those that grow on the surface) and endoliths (those that grow "within" the rocks, i.e., under and around the rock crystals). Calcareous rocks are the most common substrate for the rock-dwellers, but some, especially those in aquatic or semi-aquatic habitats, grow on siliceous rocks. Some species grow on mosses, and some grow on leaves, including all species of genus Phylloblastia. Several Verrucariaceae species are components of biological soil crusts and contribute to the formation and stabilisation of soil, particularly in somewhat arid areas; examples include members of Endocarpon and Catapyrenium. Although most species are terrestrial, there are some semi-aquatic species, with representatives from both fresh and salt water. As of 2015, there were 26 known marine Verrucariaceae, distributed amongst the genera Hydropunctaria (6 species), Mastodia (1 sp.), Verrucaria (16 spp.), and Wahlenbergiella (3 spp.). Several of these marine lichens have been investigated preliminarily to determine their suitability for use as bioindicators of coastal water pollution.

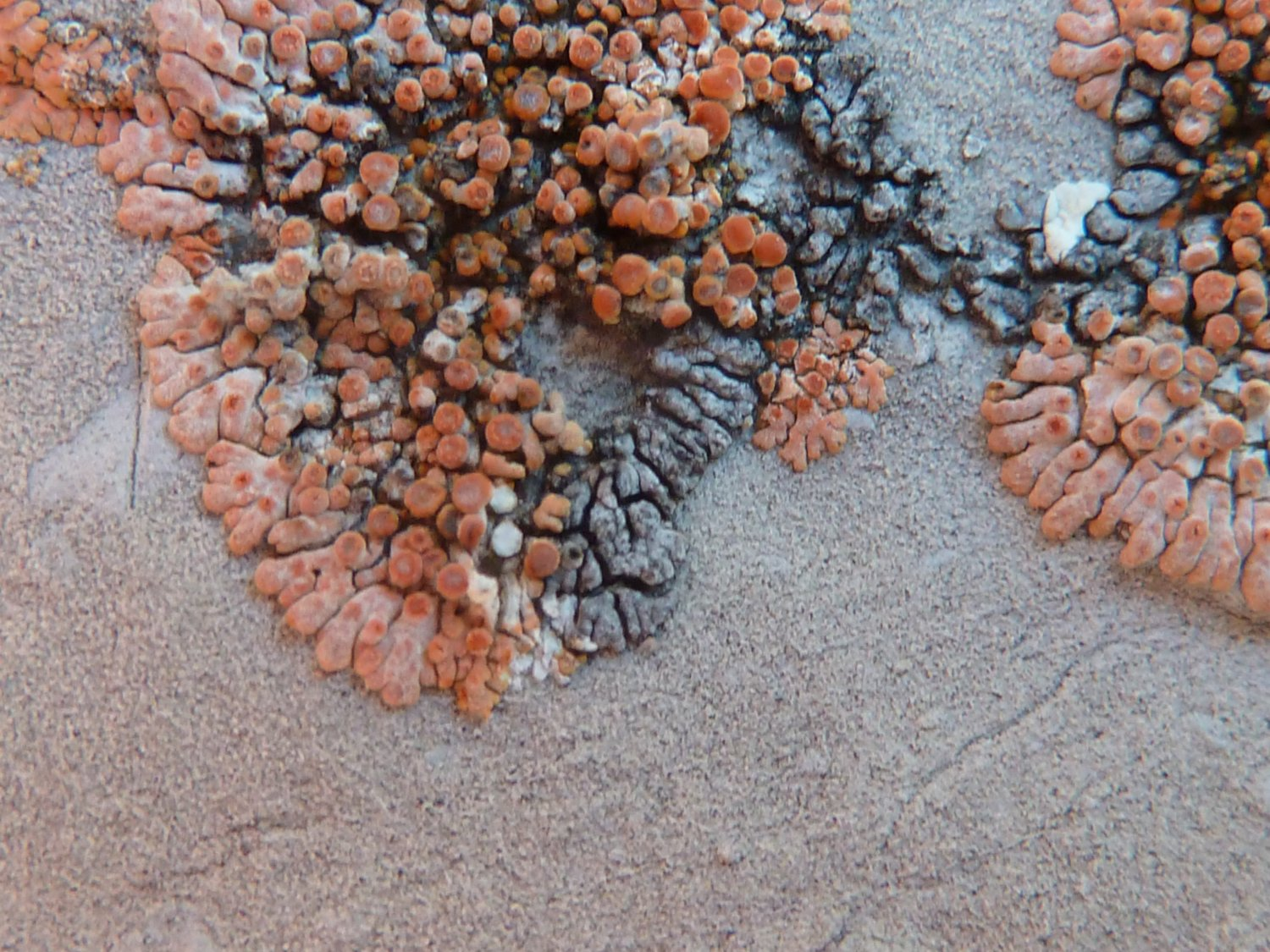
Verrucula arnoldaria (darkened parts of thallus) growing parasitically on the crustose lichen Calogaya arnoldii

Several Verrucariaceae genera consist entirely of lichenicolous (lichen-dwelling) fungi: Bellemerella, Clauzadella, Haleomyces, Halospora, Norrlinia, Phaeospora, Telogalla. Lichenicolous fungi occur in other genera to a lesser extent. Some genera, including Heteroplacidium, Placidiopsis, Placocarpus, Placopyrenium, Thelidium, Verrucaria, and Verruculopsis contain lichenicolous lichens.

Crustose Verrucariaceae species are often under-represented in local or national checklists (i.e., lists of all species in a certain area) due to their typical habitat on rocks and their inconspicuousness. For example, with the exception of Japan (77 species on a 2018 checklist), the number of Verrucariaceae species in East Asia is poorly known.

== Uses ==
There are no species in the Verrucariaceae that have any major economic significance. The only lichen in the family that has been recorded as being used in traditional medicine is Dermatocarpon miniatum. In Traditional Chinese medicine, the lichen, known as "white stone ear" (皮果衣, pí guǒ yī), is used in treatments for high blood pressure, as a diuretic, for expelling parasites, for malnutrition in children, for dysentery, to improve digestion, and for abdominal distension.

== Genera ==
These are the genera that are in the Verrucariaceae (including estimated number of species in each genus, totalling 1017 species), according to a 2021 review of fungal classification. Following the genus name is the taxonomic authority (those who first circumscribed the genus; standardised author abbreviations are used), year of publication, and the estimated number of species. Other recent estimates of the number of Verrucariaceae taxa include: 46 genera and 931 species (2008), 48–54 genera and 850–870 species (2016), and 43 genera and 943 species (2017). The GBIF accept over 60+ genera and nearly a thousand species. As of September 2022, Species Fungorum (in the Catalogue of Life), accepts 56 genera and 575 species (including 8 varieties and 6 forms) in the Verrucariaceae. The largest of these is the type genus, Verrucaria, at 146 accepted species. (Note: The Verrucariaceae species accepted by Species Fungorum are those for which they have expressed a taxonomic opinion, and does not necessarily represent the total number of species in the family.) Verrucariaceae is the third-largest family of lichen-forming fungi, following the Parmeliaceae and the Graphidaceae.

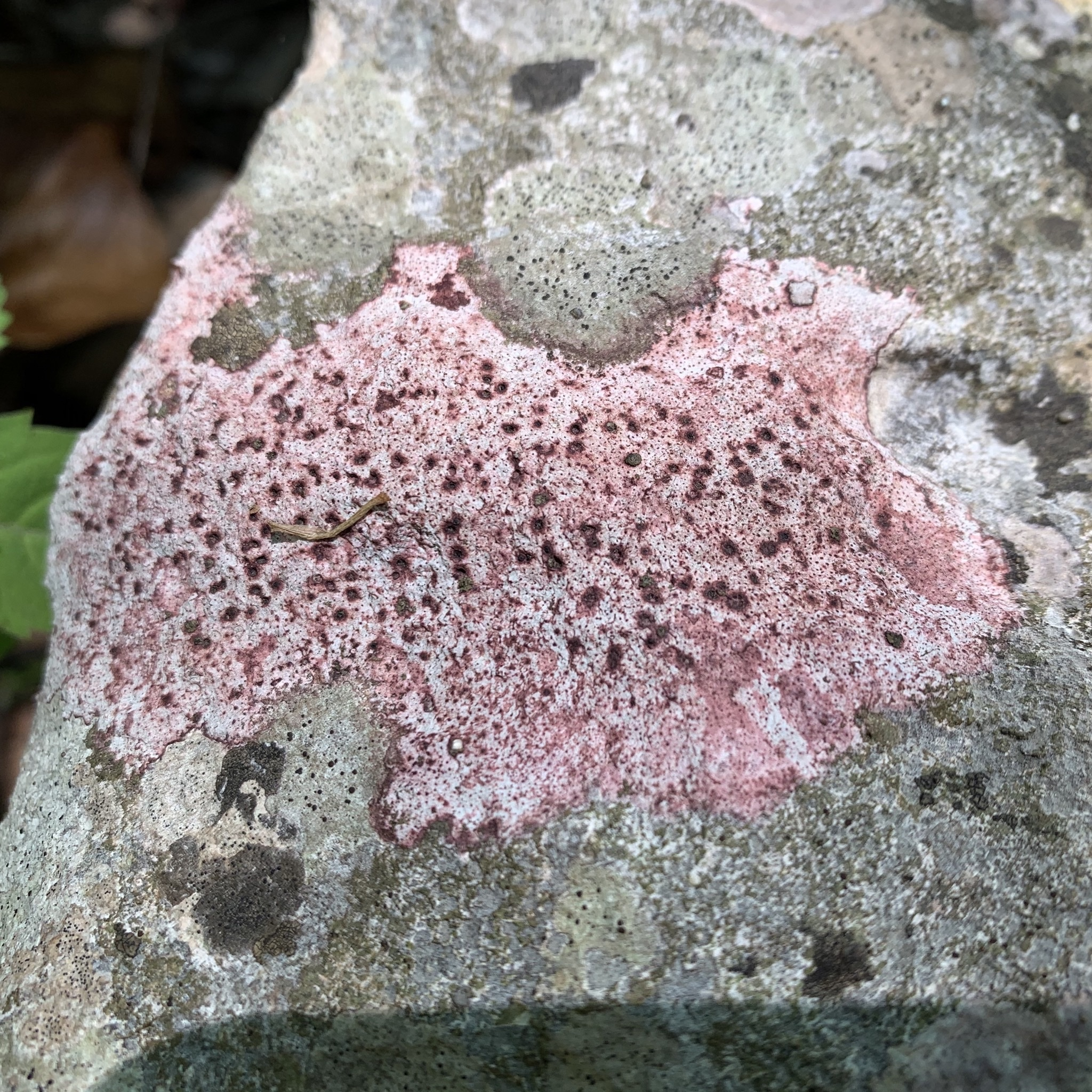
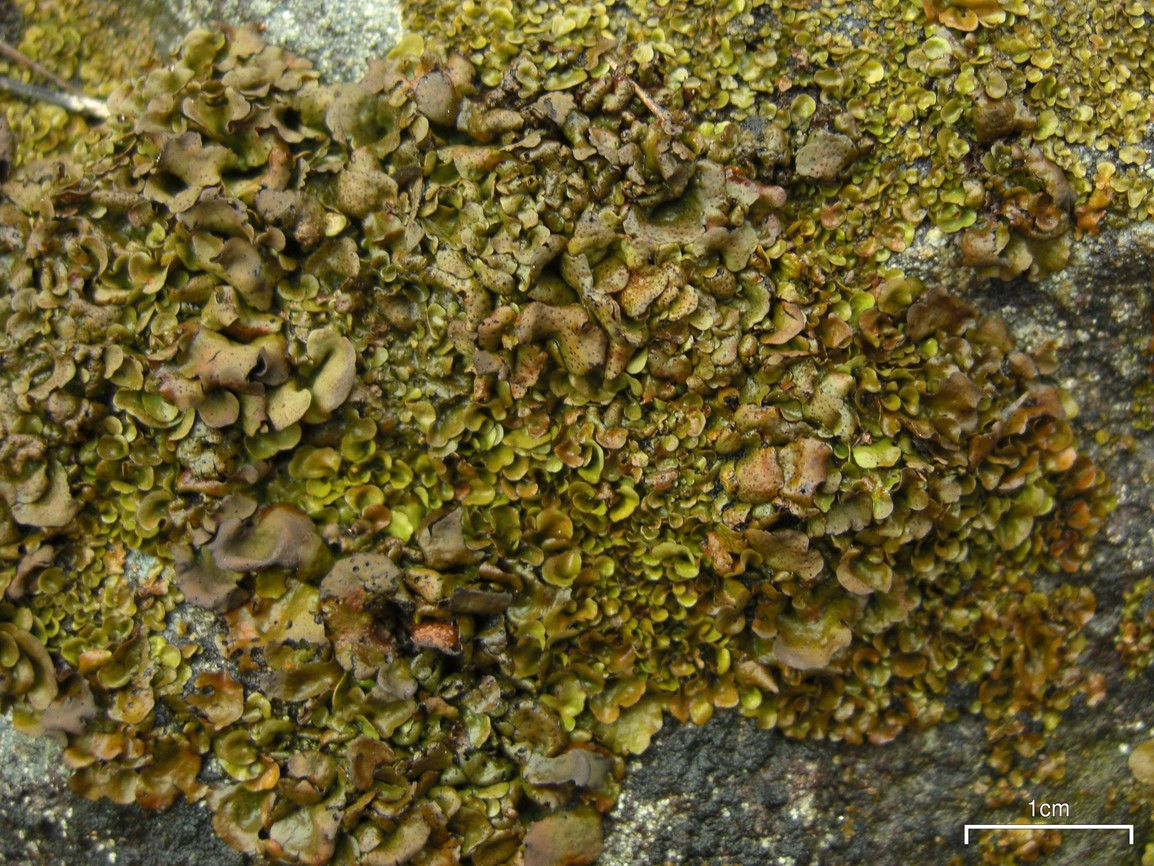
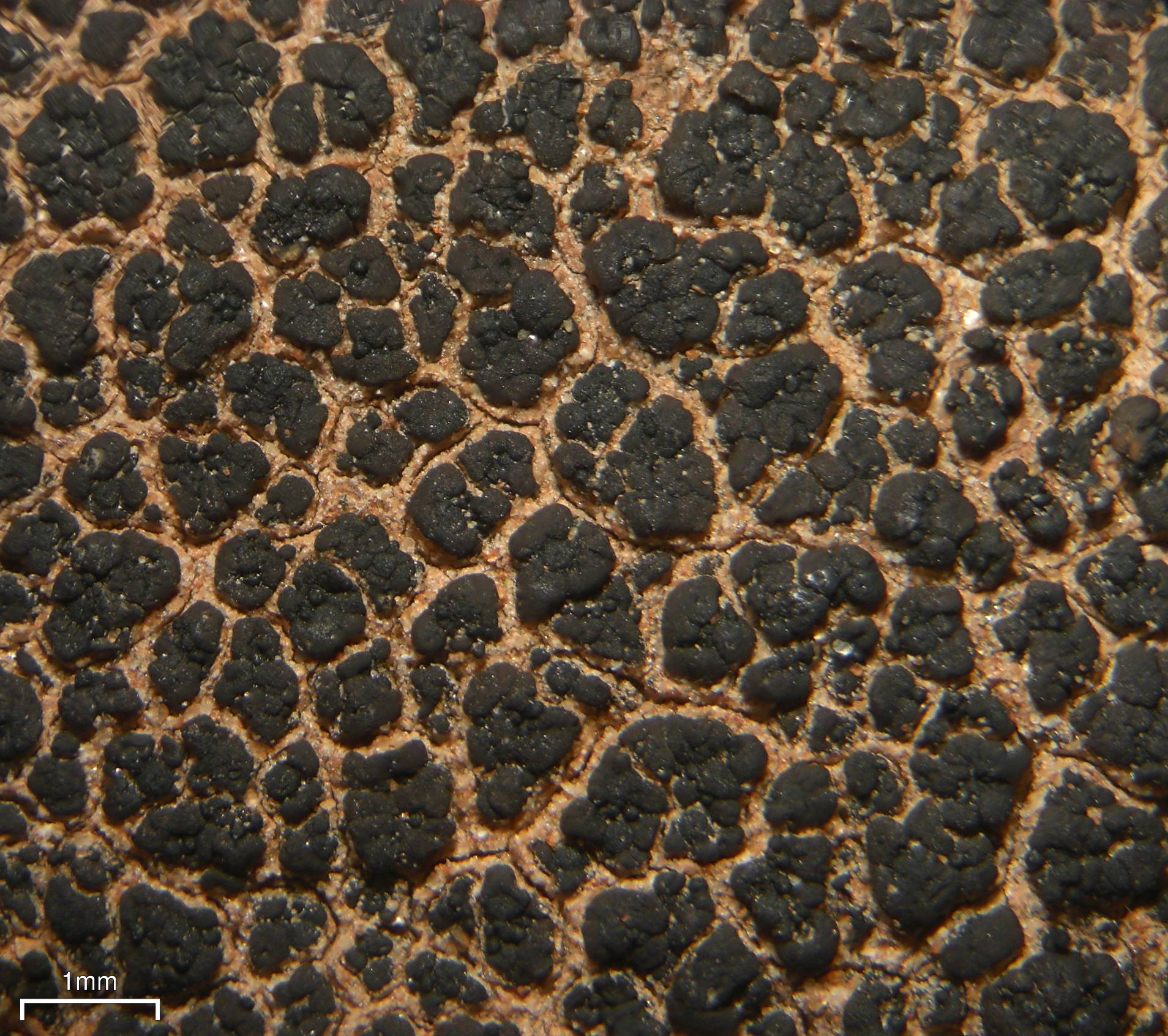
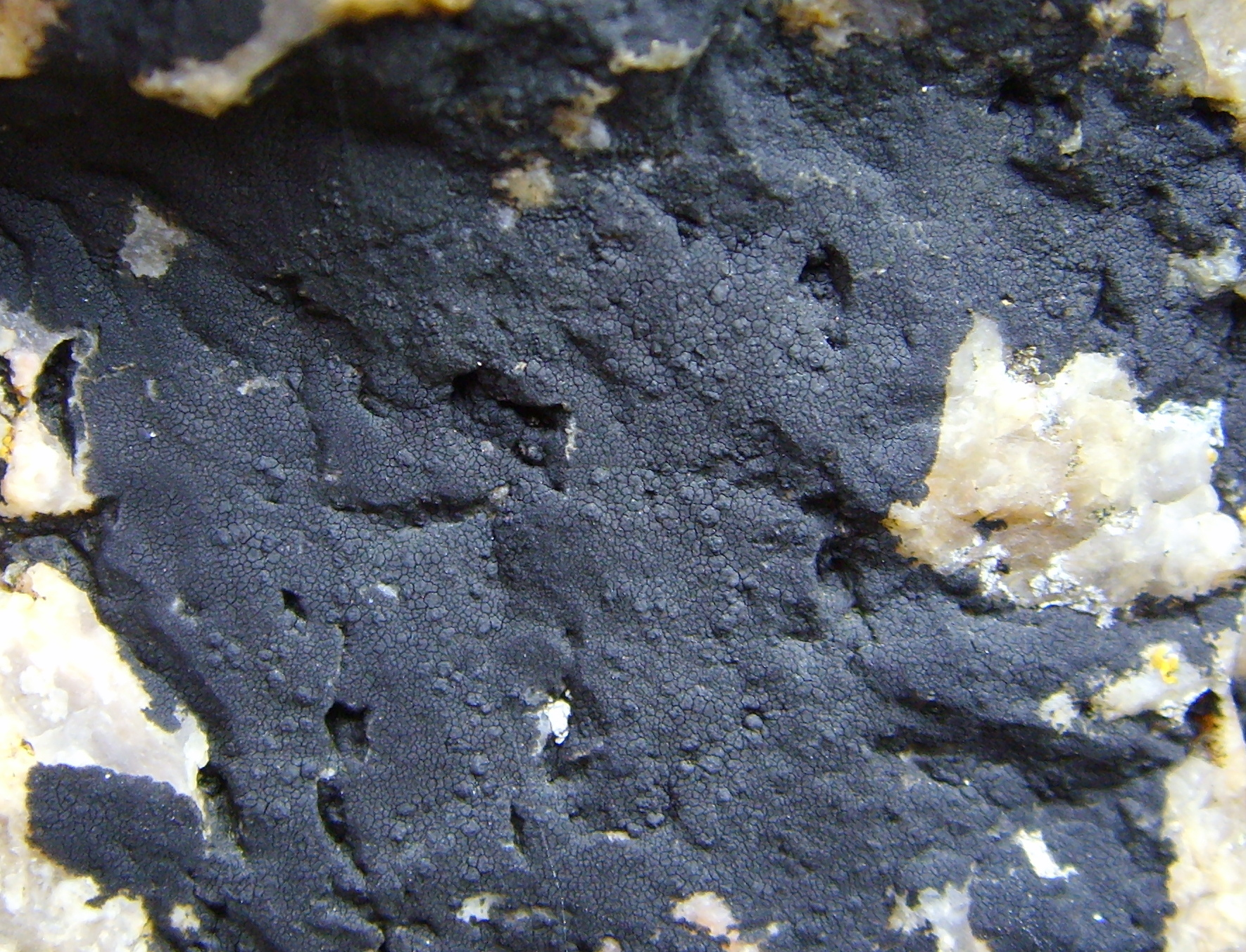
Clockwise from upper left: Bagliettoa marmorea (crustose, endolithic); Dermatocarpon luridum (foliose/umbilicate); Heteroplacidium compactum (crustose/areolate); and Hydropunctaria maura (crustose, epilithic)
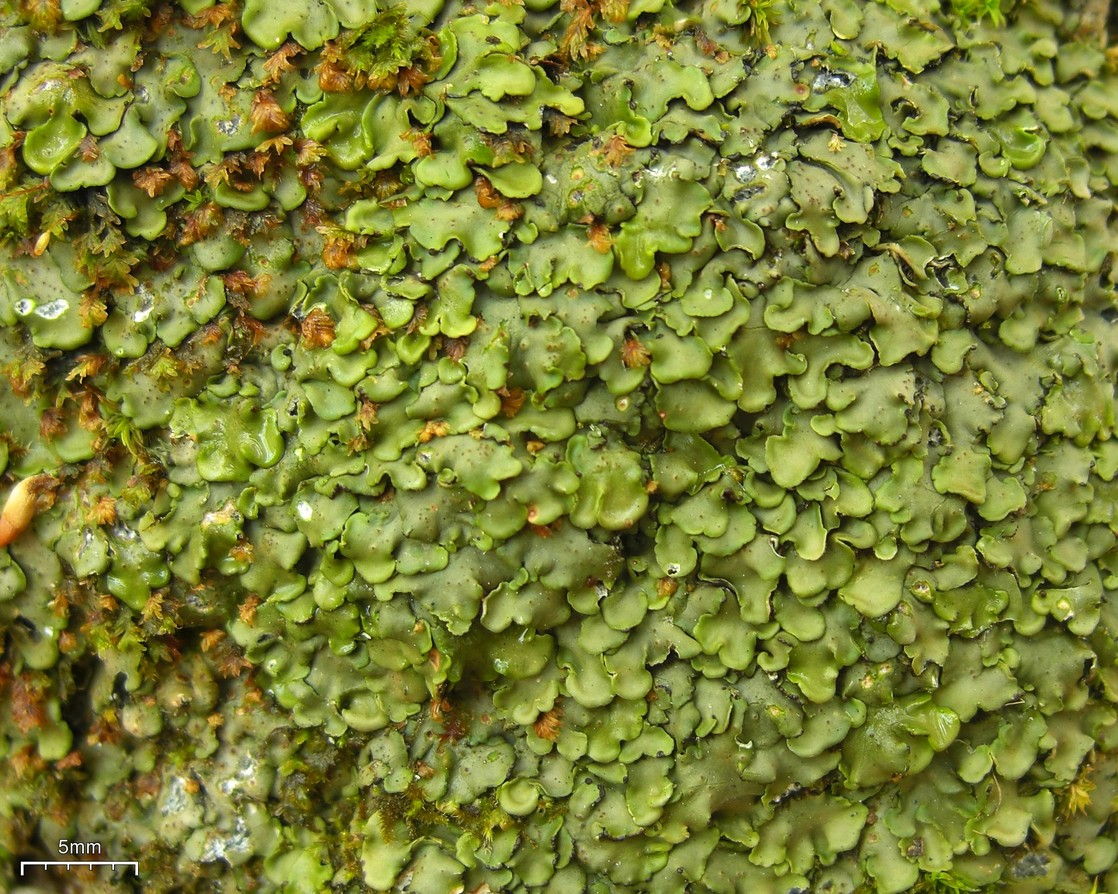
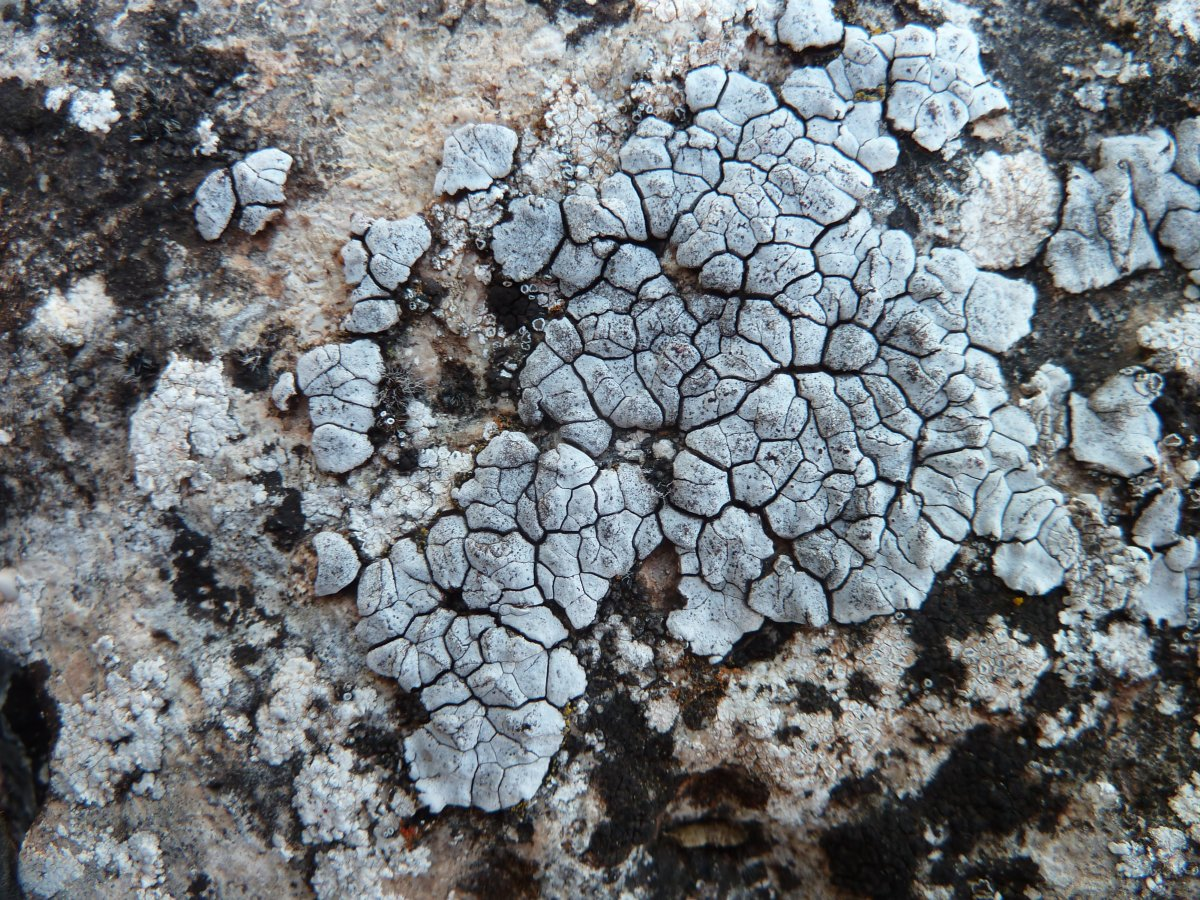
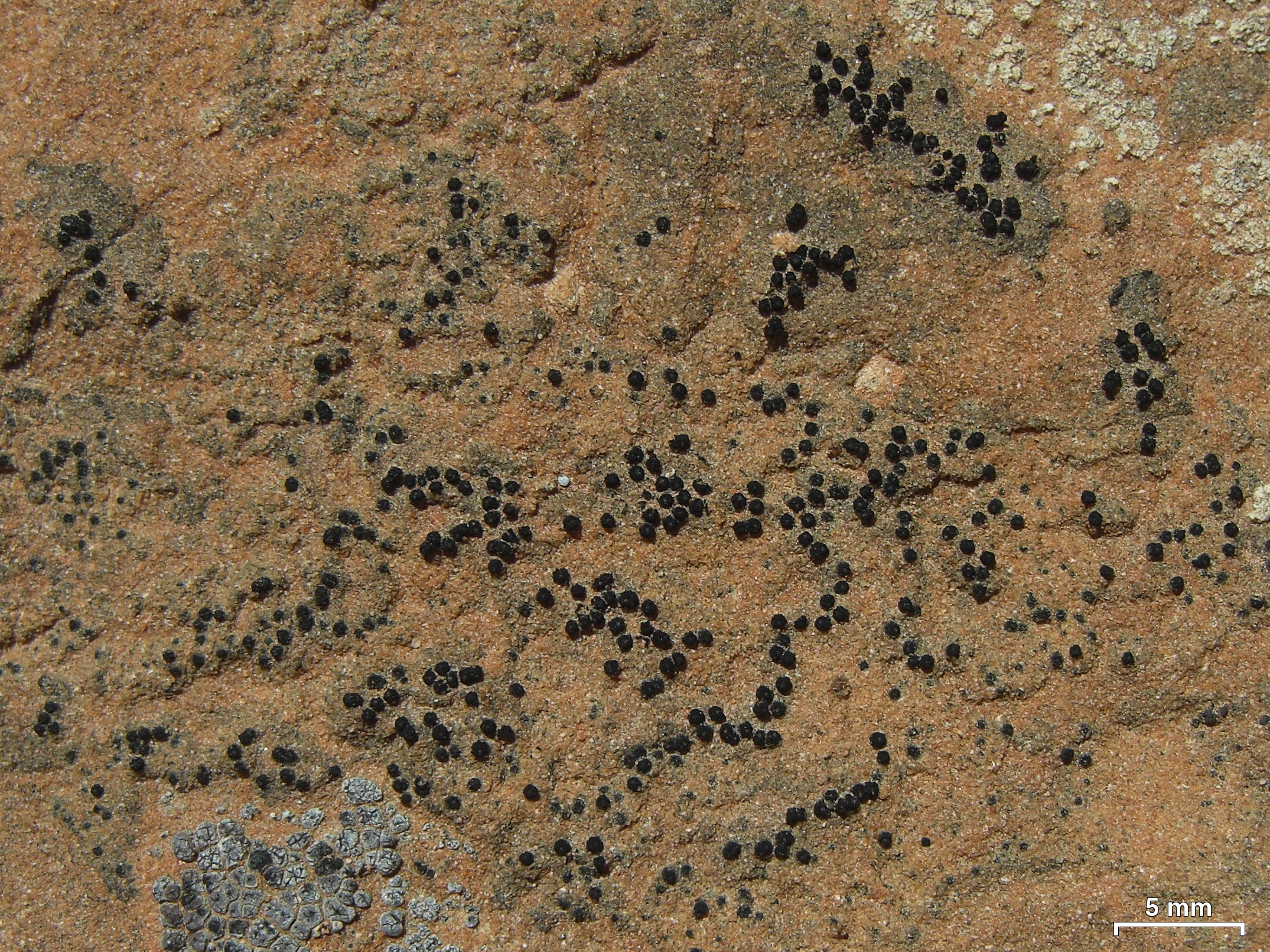
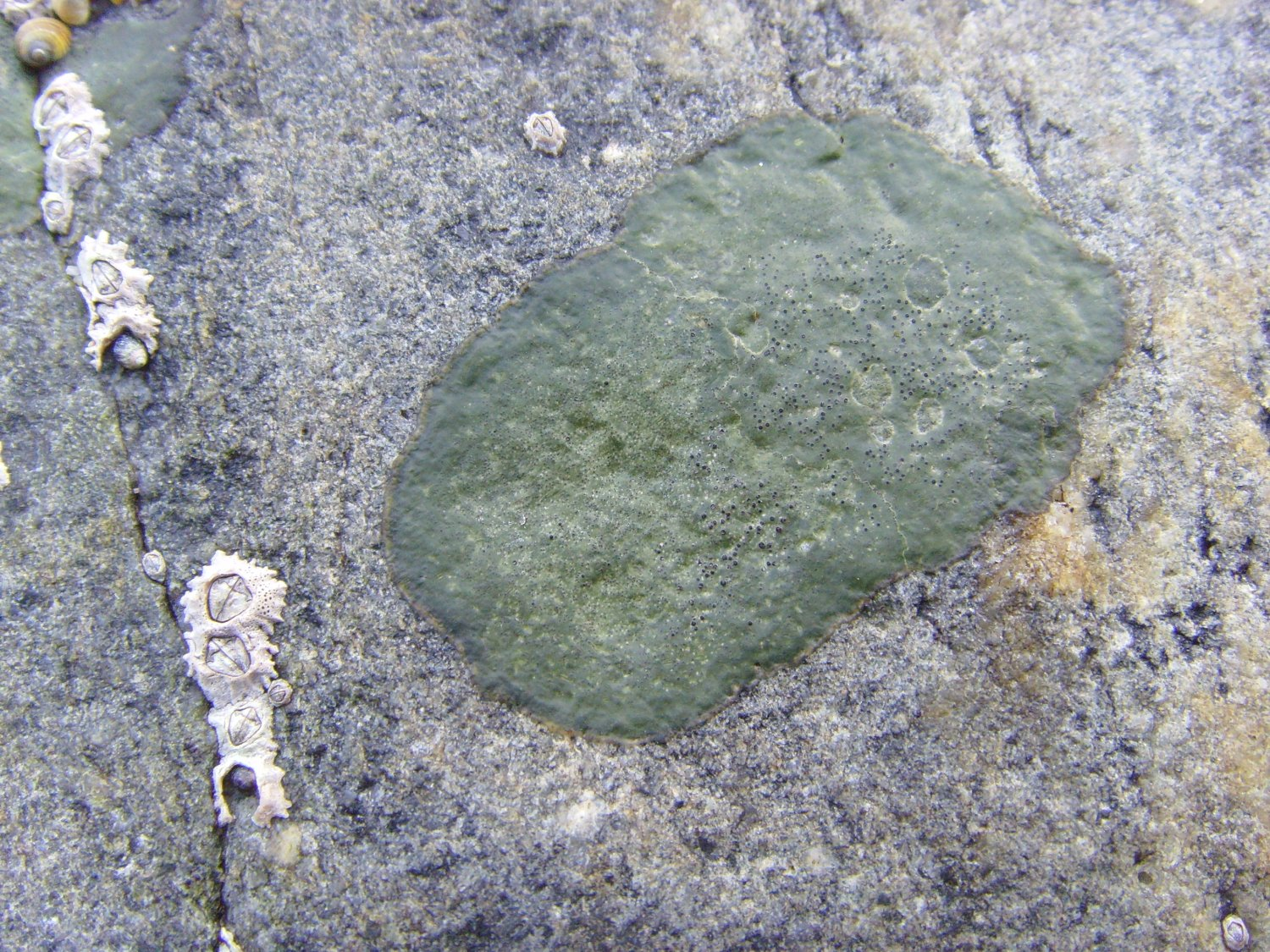
Clockwise from upper left: Placidium arboreum (squamulose, corticolous); Placocarpus schaereri (crustose/areolate, epilithic); Staurothele elenkinii (crustose, epilithic); and Wahlenbergiella mucosa (crustose, epilithic)
- Agonimia Zahlbr. (1909) – ca. 20 spp.
- Anthracocarpon Breuss (1996) – 1 sp.
- Atla S.Savić & Tibell (2008) – 10 spp.
- Awasthiella Kr.P.Singh (1980) – 1 sp.
- Bagliettoa A.Massal. (1853) – 17 spp.
- Bellemerella Nav.-Ros. & Cl.Roux (1997) – 4 spp.
- Catapyrenium Flot. (1850) – 6 spp.
- Clauzadella Nav.-Ros. & Cl.Roux (1996) – 1 sp.
- Clavascidium Breuss (1996) – 9 spp.
- Dermatocarpon Eschw. (1824) – 20 spp.
- Diederimyces Etayo (1995) – 2 spp.
- Endocarpon Hedw. (1789) – ca. 75 spp.
- Flakea O.E.Erikss. (1992) – 1 sp.
- Glomerilla Norman (1869) – 1 sp.
- Haleomyces D.Hawksw. & Essl. (1993) – 1 sp.
- Halospora (Zschacke) Tomas. & Cif. (1952) – 4 spp.
- Henrica B.de Lesd. (1921) – 4 spp.
- Heterocarpon Müll.Arg. (1885) – 1 sp.
- Heteroplacidium Breuss (1996) – 12 spp.
- Hydropunctaria C.Keller, Gueidan & Thüs (2009) – 8 spp.
- Involucropyrenium Breuss (1996) – 9 spp.
- Mastodia Hook.f. & Harv. (1847) – 5 spp.
- Moriola Norman (1872) – ca. 15 spp.
- Muellerella Hepp ex Müll.Arg. (1862) – 9 spp.
- Neocatapyrenium H.Harada (1993) – 5 spp.
- Nesothele Orange (2022) – 5 spp.
- Normandina Nyl. (1855) – 3 spp.
- Norrlinia Theiss. & Syd. (1918) – 2 spp.
- Parabagliettoa Gueidan & Cl.Roux (2009) – 3 spp.
- Phaeospora Hepp ex Stein (1879) – 14 spp.
- Phylloblastia Vain. (1921) – 12 spp.
- Placidiopsis Beltr. (1858) – 20 spp.
- Placidium A.Massal. (1855) – 28 spp.
- Placocarpus Trevis. (1860) – 5 spp.
- Placopyrenium Breuss (1987) – 22 spp.
- Placothelium Müll.Arg. (1893) – 1 sp.
- Plurisperma Sivan. (1970) – 1 sp.
- Polyblastia A.Massal. (1852) – ca. 40 + ca. 50 orphaned (Note: "Orphaned" species are those that have been named and formally described, but have not been updated and reassessed following a revision of the genus they are in.)
- Psoroglaena Müll.Arg. (1891) – 17 spp.
- Rhabdopsora Müll.Arg. (1888) – 2 spp.
- Scleropyrenium H.Harada (1993) – 2 spp.
- Servitia M.S.Christ. & Alstrup (2001) – 1 sp.
- Spheconisca (Norman) Norman (1876) – ca. 20 spp.
- Sporodictyon A.Massal. (1852) – 5 spp.
- Staurothele Norman (1852) – ca. 40 spp.
- Telogalla Nik.Hoffm. & Hafellner (2000) – 2 spp.
- Thelidiopsis Vain. (1921) – 4 spp.
- Thelidium A.Massal. (1855) – ca. 50 + ca. 50 orphaned
- Trimmatothele Norman ex Zahlbr. (1903) – 3 spp.
- Turgidosculum Kohlm. & E.Kohlm. (1972) – 1 sp.
- Verrucaria Schrad. (1794) – ca. 300 spp.
- Verrucariopsis Gueidan, Monnat & Cl.Roux (2022)
- Verrucula J.Steiner (1896) – 22 spp.
- Verruculopsis Gueidan, Nav.-Ros. & Cl.Roux (2007) – ca. 10 spp.
- Wahlenbergiella Gueidan & Thüs (2009) – 3 spp.
- Willeya Müll.Arg. (1883) – 12 spp.
