= Bellemerella =

Scientific classification
- Domain: Eukaryota
- Kingdom: Fungi
- Division: Ascomycota
- Class: Eurotiomycetes
- Order: Verrucariales
- Family: Verrucariaceae
- Genus: Bellemerella; Nav.-Ros. & Cl.Roux (1997)

Type species
- Bellemerella trapeliae Nav.-Ros. & Cl.Roux (1997)

Species
- B. acarosporae B. polysporinae B. ritae B. trapeliae

Genus of fungi

Bellemerella is a genus of fungi in the family Verrucariaceae. All four species are lichenicolous, meaning they grow parasitically on other lichens. These microscopic fungi appear as tiny black dots on the surface of their lichen hosts, forming small flask-shaped structures that release spores. Each species targets a specific type of lichen, with the four known species attacking different lichen genera such as Trapelia, Acarospora, and Polysporina.

== Taxonomy ==
Bellemerella was established by Pere Navarro-Rosinés and Claude Roux in 1997 as both a new genus and species (Bellemerella trapeliae) based on distinctive morphological characteristics that separated it from closely related genera. The genus represents a specialized lineage of non-lichenized fungi that have evolved as obligate parasites of lichens. Unlike their lichen hosts, which exist as stable symbiotic partnerships between fungi and photosynthetic partners such as algae or cyanobacteria, Bellemerella species have adopted a parasitic lifestyle, deriving their nutrients directly from the lichen thallus. This ecological specialization places them within the broader category of lichenicolous fungi, a diverse assemblage of organisms that have convergently evolved to exploit lichen hosts across multiple fungal lineages.

The taxonomic distinctiveness of Bellemerella becomes apparent when compared to morphologically similar genera within the same family, particularly Muellerella and Plurisperma. While all three genera share the basic characteristic of producing perithecia (flask-shaped reproductive structures) and have demonstrate ecological preferences for lichen hosts, they can be distinguished by several key morphological features. Bellemerella is characterized by its distinctive two-layered perithecial wall structure, consisting of a dark, pigmented outer layer and a colourless inner layer, a feature that contrasts with the more uniform wall construction seen in Muellerella. Additionally, the genus lacks the specialized subiculum (a felt-like hyphal mat) that characterizes Plurisperma, and its pseudoparaphyses (sterile filaments within the reproductive structures) follow a specific developmental pattern that further supports its taxonomic separation.

== Description ==
Bellemerella species are microscopic fungi that form small, dark, flask-shaped reproductive structures (perithecia) on the surface of their lichen hosts. These perithecia appear as tiny black dots scattered across the lichen's body, typically measuring around 150 micrometres (μm) in diameter. The perithecia have a characteristic globular shape with a slightly flattened top, and their surface appears somewhat rough or warty when examined under magnification. These structures are positioned around a small opening (ostiole), which serves as an exit point for spores, and they are typically found growing directly on the scale-like segments of Trapelia lichens known as squamules.

The internal structure of the perithecia reveals the sophisticated architecture typical of advanced fungi. The wall of each perithecium consists of two distinct layers that can be clearly distinguished under microscopic examination. The outer layer appears dark brown to black and is composed of pseudoparenchymatous tissue, meaning it resembles plant tissue but is actually made up of densely packed fungal cells. This outer layer gradually transitions to a lighter, pseudoplectenchymatous inner layer that appears colourless or very pale. The wall thickness varies between different parts of the structure, measuring 20–30 μm thick overall, with individual cells in the outer layer reaching dimensions of 2.5–8.5 × 2.2–4.5 μm.

Within each perithecium, the spore-producing apparatus consists of elongated sac-like structures (asci), which are arranged in a layer along the inner wall. These asci are club-shaped or cylindrical, measuring 35–55 × 9–11 μm, and each typically contains eight ascospores arranged in a single row. The asci are accompanied by sterile filaments (pseudoparaphyses), which help in spore dispersal and maintain the proper spacing and orientation of the reproductive structures. These pseudoparaphyses are relatively short, measuring 10–17 μm in length, and have a distinctive branched structure near their base.

The ascospores themselves are elongated and colourless, appearing almost cylindrical with slightly tapered ends. When mature, they measure 5.5–6.9 × 1.5–1.6 μm and have smooth walls without any visible surface ornamentation. These spores are released through the ostiole at the top of the perithecium and presumably disperse to find new lichen hosts. The fungus also produces vegetative structures including branching hyphal networks that penetrate the host lichen tissue, though these are typically not visible without specialized microscopic techniques and tissue preparation methods.

== Species ==
- Bellemerella acarosporae Calat. & Nav.-Ros. (2001) – host: Acarospora fuscata
- Bellemerella polysporinae Calat. & Nav.-Ros. (2001) – host: Polysporina simplex
- Bellemerella ritae Pérez-Ort. & T.Sprib. (2007) – host: Xylographa
- Bellemerella trapeliae Nav.-Ros. & Cl.Roux (1997) – host: Trapelia
