= Trimmatothele =

Scientific classification
- Domain: Eukaryota
- Kingdom: Fungi
- Division: Ascomycota
- Class: Eurotiomycetes
- Order: Verrucariales
- Family: Verrucariaceae
- Genus: Trimmatothele; Norman ex Zahlbr. (1903)

Type species
- Trimmatothele perquisita (Norman) Norman ex Zahlbr. (1903)

Species
- T. glacialis T. maritima T. perquisita T. petri T. umbellulariae

Genus of lichens

Trimmatothele is a genus of saxicolous (rock-dwelling), crustose lichens in the family Verrucariaceae. It has five species. The genus was formally published by lichenologist Alexander Zahlbruckner in 1903. The type species, Trimmatothele perquisita, was originally collected from Norway by Johannes M. Norman, who placed it in the genus Coniothele in 1868. Diagnostic characteristics of Trimmatothele include a thin thallus with a smooth surface; small perithecia that are partially immersed in the substrata and have an involucrellum; asci that contain multiple ascospores; and small, simple ascospores (i.e., without any septa). Trimmatothele has been described as one of the most poorly known genera of lichens due to the rarity of its species, the few available herbarium specimens, and some missing type specimens.

== Species ==
- Trimmatothele glacialis Nilson (1907)
- Trimmatothele maritima (Harm.) Zahlbr. (1931)
- Trimmatothele perquisita (Norman) Norman ex Zahlbr. (1903)
- Trimmatothele petri Diederich (2017) – Seychelles
- Trimmatothele umbellulariae Herre (1912)
