= Placidiopsis hypothallina =

Scientific classification
- Domain: Eukaryota
- Kingdom: Fungi
- Division: Ascomycota
- Class: Eurotiomycetes
- Order: Verrucariales
- Family: Verrucariaceae
- Genus: Placidiopsis
- Species: P. hypothallina

Binomial name
- Placidiopsis hypothallina Aptroot (2002)

Species of lichen

Placidiopsis hypothallina is a species of saxicolous (rock-dwelling) crustose lichen in the family Verrucariaceae, described as a new species in 2002. It is unique within its genus for its thallus primarily composed of a hyphal hypothallus resembling a subiculum found in some non-lichenised ascomycetes. It is found in Brazil and Taiwan.

== Taxonomy ==
Described by the Dutch lichenologist André Aptroot in 2002, Placidiopsis hypothallina was identified from collections made in the Serra do Caraça in Minas Gerais, Brazil.

== Description ==
The thallus of Placidiopsis hypothallina is crustose, typically covering rounded areas up to 0.5 cm in diameter. It features a distinctive hypothallus consisting of loose, blackish hyphae with numerous isolated squamules. These squamules are dark brown, flat, and rounded to lobate, measuring 50–200 μm in diameter and 50–100 μm thick, each bordered by a thin black margin.

The upper cortex of the squamules is dark brown and cellular, about 3–5 μm thick, while the medulla is paraplectenchymatous and hyaline (translucent). The perithecia are fully immersed within the thallus, pyriform (pear-shaped), and hyaline, measuring 50–80 μm in diameter. The ostiole (opening) of each perithecium is centrally located, appearing as a black dot from above, and measures 30–50 μm wide.

Asci (spore-bearing structures) are pyriform, approximately 25–35 by 8–13 μm, and do not possess an ocular chamber. Ascospores are hyaline, 1-septate, long-ellipsoid to clavate, measuring 8–10 by 2.5–3 μm, and are arranged irregularly within the asci. No pycnidia have been observed to occur in this species.

Chemically, the species shows no reactions to standard lichen spot tests (K−, C−, UV−), indicating the absence of detectable secondary metabolites.

== Habitat and distribution ==
Placidiopsis hypothallina is found growing on sun-exposed siliceous rocks, often accompanied by species of the foliose lichen genus Xanthoparmelia. At the time of its original publication in 2002, it had only been recorded from its type location in Brazil. Its known range was extended considerably the following year, when Aptroot recorded it from Taiwan. Those specimens were found growing parasitically on an undescribed species of Trapelia that itself was growing on volcanic rock. It has also been found in the Serra de Maracaju, Mato Grosso do Sul, Brazil.
