= Glomerilla =

Scientific classification
- Domain: Eukaryota
- Kingdom: Fungi
- Division: Ascomycota
- Class: Eurotiomycetes
- Order: Verrucariales
- Family: Verrucariaceae
- Genus: Glomerilla; Norman
- Species: G. subtilis

Binomial name
- Glomerilla subtilis Norman (1869)

Genus of fungi

Glomerilla is a genus of fungi in the family Verrucariaceae. A monotypic genus, it contains the single species Glomerilla subtilis.
