= Coccobotrys =

Coccobotrys may refer to:

- Coccobotrys (alga) Chodat, 1913, a genus of algae in the family Chaetophoraceae
- Coccobotrys (fungus) Boud. & Pat., 1900, a genus of fungi in the family Agaricaceae
