= Scleropyrenium =

Scientific classification
- Kingdom: Fungi
- Division: Ascomycota
- Class: Eurotiomycetes
- Order: Verrucariales
- Family: Verrucariaceae
- Genus: Scleropyrenium; H.Harada (1993)

Type species
- Scleropyrenium japonicum H.Harada (1993)

Species
- S. japonicum S. kurokawae

Genus of lichens

Scleropyrenium is a genus of squamulose (scaly) lichens in the family Verrucariaceae. It has two species. The genus was circumscribed in 1993 by Japanese lichenologist Hiroshi Harada, with S. japonicum as the type species. Characteristics of the genus include a dark brown to almost black exciple (the rim of tissue around the hymenium), pycnidia of the Staurothele-type, and a pachydermatous upper cortex.
