= Telogalla =

Scientific classification
- Domain: Eukaryota
- Kingdom: Fungi
- Division: Ascomycota
- Class: Eurotiomycetes
- Order: Verrucariales
- Family: Verrucariaceae
- Genus: Telogalla; Nik.Hoffm. & Hafellner (200)

Type species
- Telogalla olivieri (Vouaux) Nik.Hoffm. & Hafellner (2000)

Species
- T. cajasensis T. olivieri

Genus of fungi

Telogalla is a genus of lichenicolous fungi in the family Verrucariaceae. It has two species. The genus was circumscribed by Nikolaus Hoffmann and Josef Hafellner.

== Species ==
- Telogalla cajasensis Etayo (2017) – host: Leptogium
- Telogalla olivieri (Vouaux) Nik.Hoffm. & Hafellner (2000) – host: Xanthoria

The species Telogalla physciicola Ihlen & R.Sant. (2005) is now known as Lichenochora physciicola.
