= Diederimyces =

Scientific classification
- Kingdom: Fungi
- Division: Ascomycota
- Class: Eurotiomycetes
- Order: Verrucariales
- Family: Verrucariaceae
- Genus: Diederimyces; Etayo

Type species
- Diederimyces fuscideae Etayo

Genus of fungi

Diederimyces is a genus of fungi in the family Verrucariaceae. A monotypic genus, it contains the single species Diederimyces fuscideae.

The genus name of Diederimyces is in honour of Paul Diederich (b.1959) Luxemburg born mathematician and botanist (Mycology and Lichenology).

The genus was circumscribed by Javier Etayo Salazar in Nova Hedwigia Vol.61 (1–2) on page 190 in 1995.
