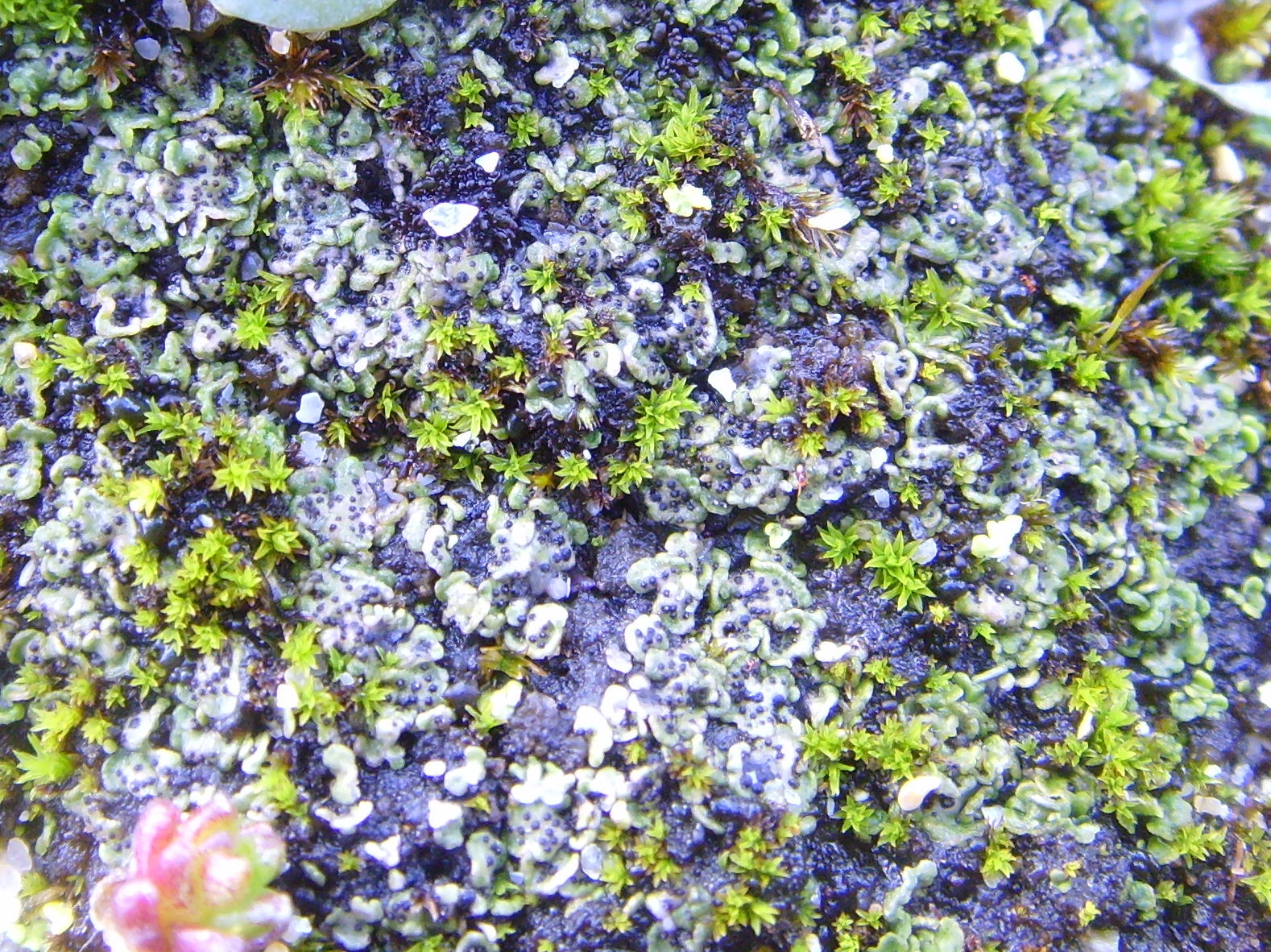
- Placidiopsis custnani

Scientific classification
- Domain: Eukaryota
- Kingdom: Fungi
- Division: Ascomycota
- Class: Eurotiomycetes
- Order: Verrucariales
- Family: Verrucariaceae
- Genus: Placidiopsis; Beltr. (1858)

Type species
- Placidiopsis grappae Beltr. (1858)

Synonyms
- Bohleria Trevis. (1860); Endocarpidium Müll.Arg. (1862); Paraplacidiopsis Servít (1953)

= Placidiopsis =

Genus of lichens

Placidiopsis is a genus of lichens in the family Verrucariaceae. The genus was circumscribed by Italian naturalist Francesco Beltramini de Casati in 1858, with Placidiopsis grappae assigned as the type species.

== Species ==
- Placidiopsis cinerascens (Nyl.) Breuss (2010)
- Placidiopsis cavicola Etayo & Breuss (1994)
- Placidiopsis cinereoides Breuss (1996)
- Placidiopsis crassa (Anzi) Clauzade & Cl.Roux (1985)
- Placidiopsis custnani (A.Massal.) Körb. (1863)
- Placidiopsis grappae Beltr. (1858)
- Placidiopsis hamadicola Bredkina (1972)
- Placidiopsis hypothallina Aptroot (2002) – Brazil
- Placidiopsis minor R.C.Harris (1979)
- Placidiopsis novozelandica C.W.Dodge (1971)
- Placidiopsis oreades Breuss (1996)
- Placidiopsis parva P.M.McCarthy (2019) – Australia
- Placidiopsis poronioides Aptroot (1999) – Hong Kong
- Placidiopsis pseudocinerea Breuss (1983) – Europe
- Placidiopsis sbarbaronis (Servít) Clauzade & Cl. Roux (1985)
- Placidiopsis tiroliensis Breuss (1989)
- Placidiopsis tominii Bredkina (1972)
