= Henrica =

Scientific classification
- Domain: Eukaryota
- Kingdom: Fungi
- Division: Ascomycota
- Class: Eurotiomycetes
- Order: Verrucariales
- Family: Verrucariaceae
- Genus: Henrica; B.de Lesd. (1921)

Type species
- Henrica ramulosa B.de Lesd. (1921)

Species
- H. americana H. melaspora H. ramulosa H. theleodes

Genus of lichen-forming fungi

Henrica is a genus of crustose lichens in the family Verrucariaceae. It has four species. These lichens grow as crusts that adhere tightly to limestone, sandstone, and other hard rocks, ranging from paper-thin films to thick, warted layers in subdued colours of white, pale grey, or fawn. They reproduce through black to dark-brown flask-shaped fruiting bodies that contain distinctive brown spores divided into numerous cells like a brick wall, giving them a characteristic muriform appearance.

== Taxonomy ==
The genus was circumscribed by Maurice Bouly de Lesdain in 1921, with Henrica ramulosa assigned as the type species. The generic name Henrica honours the Italian clergyman and lichenologist Joseph-Marie Henry (1870–1947).

== Description ==
Henrica grows as a crust that adheres tightly to the surface of limestone, sandstone, or other hard rock. The thallus (lichen body) ranges from almost submerged in the stone to clearly sitting on top of it, and can be anything from a paper-thin film to a rather thick, warted layer. Colours are subdued—usually white, pale grey, or fawn—and the surface may be smooth, cracked into clearly separated areoles, or even lift slightly at the edges so that each areole resembles a tiny, scalloped shield. Some species are dusted with a bright white frost-like coating (pruina), while others are entirely matt. The photosynthetic partner is a single-celled green alga of the chlorococcoid type; the genus lacks the cyanobacterial nodules (cephalodia) seen in certain other lichens, and the spore-bearing tissue contains no algal cells at all.

The sexual fruit bodies are perithecia—hemispherical, black to dark-brown flasks that stand proud of the thallus or sit half-embedded in it. Each perithecium is capped by an involucrellum, a second wall that merges with the main exciple and offers extra protection. Inside, only short, peg-like filaments (periphysoids) are present, lining the cavity. The asci follow the so-called Verrucaria pattern: they are club-shaped, discharge eight spores, and sit on a stalk. Mature spores are ellipsoidal, medium to dark brown, and divided like a brick wall into numerous cells—typically 5–16 cross-walls and up to five longitudinal walls—giving them a muriform (brick-like) appearance. No specialised asexual propagules or distinctive lichen products are known, so identification relies mainly on thallus form, perithecial structure, and spore anatomy.

== Species ==
- Henrica americana Breuss (2002)
- Henrica melaspora (Taylor) Savić & Tibell (2008)
- Henrica ramulosa B.de Lesd. (1921)
- Henrica theleodes (Sommerf.) Savić, Tibell & Nav.-Ros. (2008)
