= Heterocarpon =

Scientific classification
- Domain: Eukaryota
- Kingdom: Fungi
- Division: Ascomycota
- Class: Eurotiomycetes
- Order: Verrucariales
- Family: Verrucariaceae
- Genus: Heterocarpon; Müll.Arg.

Type species
- Heterocarpon ochroleucum (Tuck.) Müll.Arg.

Genus of lichen-forming fungi

Heterocarpon is a genus of lichen-forming fungi in the family Verrucariaceae.
