= Moriola =

Scientific classification
- Domain: Eukaryota
- Kingdom: Fungi
- Division: Ascomycota
- Class: Eurotiomycetes
- Order: Verrucariales
- Family: Verrucariaceae
- Genus: Moriola; Norman (1872)

Type species
- Moriola descensa Norman (1872)

Species
- See text

Synonyms
- Moriolomyces Cif. & Tomas. (1953)

Genus of lichens

Moriola is a poorly-known genus of fungi in the family Verrucariaceae. It has 17 species. Members of the genus parasitise various algal species; some species are considered to be saprotrophic or "doubtfully lichenized".

The genus was proposed by Norwegian botanist Johannes M. Norman in 1872. He did not designate a type species for the genus, but Moriola descensa was proposed as lectotype by Frederic Clements and Cornelius Lott Shear in 1931. Ove Eriksson suggested that M. pseudomyces would be a better choice as type. Moriola fungi are not very well known, and many species in the genus are known only from their type specimens, collected by Norman from Norway or Tyrol. Only a single species of Moriola has been recollected (from France) and documented in the 20th century. As of 2016, there was no molecular data for any members of the genus.

Moriola was previously classified in the order Dothideomycetes. However, some authors noticed a similarity to the Verrucariales genus Merismatium, such as the lack of periphysoids and the plurilocular to muriform brownish spores. Consequently, Moriola was placed in the Verrucariaceae in a 2016 review of lichen classification.

The family Moriolaceae was proposed by Alexander Zahlbruckner in 1898 to contain the genus, but this family has not been used in two recent reviews of fungal classification.

== Species ==
As of October 2022, Species Fungorum (in the Catalogue of Life) accepts 17 species of Moriola.

- Moriola aethalea Norman (1872)
- Moriola alpestris Norman (1927)
- Moriola areolata Norman (1927)
- Moriola arthopyrenioides Norman (1926)
- Moriola blattaria Norman (1872)
- Moriola carbunculosa Norman (1927)
- Moriola carpocharis Norman (1926)
- Moriola crustularia Norman (1927)
- Moriola descensa Norman (1872)
- Moriola melianthira Norman (1927)
- Moriola mycetoides Norman (1927)
- Moriola nigra Groenh. (1936)
- Moriola pseudomyces (Norman) Norman (1872)
- Moriola pyrifera Norman (1874)
- Moriola quasillaria Norman (1872)
- Moriola resinae Norman (1872)
- Moriola sanguifica Norman (1872)
