= Haleomyces =

Scientific classification
- Kingdom: Fungi
- Division: Ascomycota
- Class: Eurotiomycetes
- Order: Verrucariales
- Family: Verrucariaceae
- Genus: Haleomyces; D.Hawksw. & Essl. (1993)
- Species: H. oropogonicola

Binomial name
- Haleomyces oropogonicola D.Hawksw. & Essl. (1993)

Single-species fungal genus

Haleomyces is a fungal genus in the family Verrucariaceae. A monotypic genus, it contains the single species Haleomyces oropogonicola. This parasitic fungus was discovered in high-elevation forests of Mexico and Venezuela, where it lives exclusively on the beard lichen Oropogon lopezii, appearing as tiny blackish pin-points that merge into irregular dark patches on the pale-grey strands of its host. The fungus produces flask-shaped fruiting bodies containing colourless, spindle-shaped spores divided by a single cross-wall, and it gradually damages and replaces the host tissue beneath its black clusters without forming any independent body of its own.

== Taxonomy ==
Haleomyces was erected in 1993 after David L. Hawksworth and Theodore Lee Esslinger discovered an unfamiliar fungus parasitising the beard-lichen Oropogon lopezii in high-elevation forests of Oaxaca, Mexico, and the Venezuelan Andes. They found no comparable organism among the 29 other New-World members of Oropogon, so they coined the monotypic combination Haleomyces oropogonicola—literally "dweller on Oropogon". The holotype specimen was collected at roughly 3,100 m above San Felipe Tejalapam. As a lichenicolous species it lives on, and ultimately damages, the host thallus rather than forming its own independently visible lichen body.

The genus was created because the fungus combines traits that are rarely seen together. Its minute, brown-black perithecia (flask-shaped fruit bodies) sit on the host surface and soon merge in a shared stroma; inside, thin-walled, iodine-negative asci release colourless one-septate spores. The stromatic habit resembles certain bitunicate lineages, yet the asci lack the thick inner wall typical of those groups. Because the wall structure, absence of apical specialisation and iodine reaction echo the mostly rock-inhabiting order Verrucariales, Hawksworth and Esslinger placed Haleomyces there with caution.

Examination of 1,463 herbarium specimens covering every New World Oropogon species found H. oropogonicola only on O. lopezii, indicating a marked host-specific relationship. Prior to its discovery, no lichen-dwelling fungi were known from Oropogon, and very few had been recorded from other "beard lichens" (previously classified in the family Alectoriaceae sensu stricto). Haleomyces is therefore the first named lichenicolous fungus for the genus and one of the few for this morphological group.

== Description ==
Viewed with a hand lens the parasite betrays its presence as tiny, blackish pin-points that soon coalesce into irregular, slightly raised patches up to about 0.4 mm across on the pale-grey strands of its host, Oropogon lopezii. Each fruit body is a flask-shaped structure (a perithecium) partly immersed in, and partly breaking through, the host cortex. The perithecia are somewhat spherical (subglobose) to ovoid, 70–120 micrometres (μm) high and 50–95 μm wide, and they share a thin layer of dark stromatic tissue. Their outer wall (exciple) is 15–30 μm thick and merges imperceptibly with the stroma, while the top is perforated by a minute pore (ostiole) through which spores are released.

Inside the perithecium a crowd of slender, unbranched hyphal filaments (periphyses) 1–2) μm thick lines the neck. The spore-bearing sacs (asci) are thin-walled, cylindrical to narrowly club-shaped, non-reactive to iodine staining and eight-spored, measuring 35–65 μm long by 6.5–10 μm wide. Their contents mature into colourless, smooth, spindle-shaped (fusiform) spores that are divided once across the middle (1-septate) but show no waist-like constriction. Each spore is 14–17.5 μm long by 2.5–3 μm wide and may contain up to four tiny oil droplets.

The fungus lacks a body of its own that contains photosynthetic algae, so all nourishment comes from hyphae that infiltrate the host medulla and gradually supplant the host tissues beneath the black fruit-body clusters. Apart from this localised damage, no independent thallus is produced, and the parasite is detected chiefly by the discrete black stromata interrupting the otherwise pale beard-lichen.
