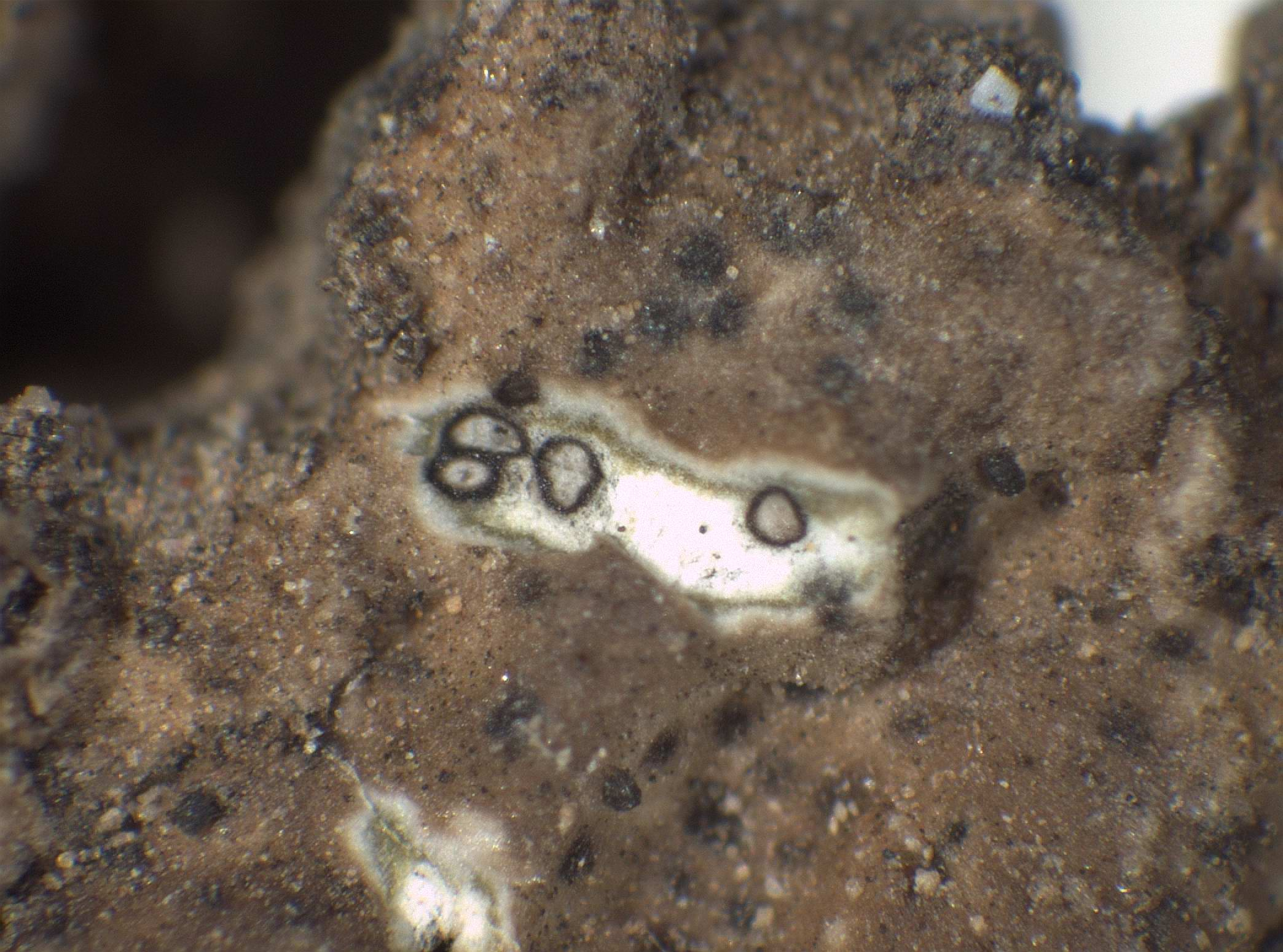
- Anthracocarpon virescens, showing sectioned perithecia (fruiting bodies) with carbonised walls

Scientific classification
- Domain: Eukaryota
- Kingdom: Fungi
- Division: Ascomycota
- Class: Eurotiomycetes
- Order: Verrucariales
- Family: Verrucariaceae
- Genus: Anthracocarpon; Breuss (1996)

Type species
- Anthracocarpon virescens (Zahlbr.) Breuss (1996)

Species
- A. andinum A. caribaeum A. virescens

= Anthracocarpon =

Genus of lichens

Anthracocarpon is a small fungal genus in the family Verrucariaceae. It is found in Mediterranean regions, the Caribbean, and South America. These lichens form low, crusty patches made up of overlapping scales that grow close to the ground on limestone and other rocky surfaces. The genus is recognized by its distinctive coal-black fruiting bodies, which give it its name—derived from Greek words meaning "coal" and "fruit". Established in 1996, the genus currently includes three species.

== Taxonomy ==
The Austrian lichenologist Othmar Breuss circumscribed Anthracocarpon in 1996 during his revision of the polyphyletic genus Catapyrenium. He removed the Mediterranean species then known as Dermatocarpon virescens and set it apart on three linked characters: its scale-forming squamulose thallus, the coal-black (carbonised) wall of the perithecia, and pycnidia with a single, Staurothele-type cavity rather than the multi-locular form seen in many allied Verrucariaceae. Breuss coined the generic name from Greek ἄνθραξ (ánthrax, "coal") and καρπός (karpós, "fruit'), a direct nod to those soot-black fruiting bodies. Subsequent phylogenetic and anatomical work has confirmed Anthracocarpon as a distinct, small lineage within the catapyrenioid clade of Verrucariaceae.

Although first treated as monospecific, the genus has since expanded to three accepted species. Breuss added A. caribaeum in 1999 from humid limestone forest in Puerto Rico; it differs from the type species in its smaller, paler squamules, basally pale perithecial wall, and more regularly ellipsoidal spores. A decade later María Prieto, Gregorio Aragón Rubio and Breuss described A. andinum from high-elevation sites in northern Argentina; this Andean taxon has thicker, sulcate squamules, paler rhizines, and measurably broader, shorter ascospores than A. virescens.

== Description ==
Anthracocarpon forms a low, earth-hugging crust built from overlapping, scale-like lobes (squamules) that recall those of the genus Placidium. Each squamule is anchored by a network of fine fungal threads (rhizohyphae) that arise directly from the internal medulla; these threads are initially colourless but often turn pale brown and can give way to darker, rope-like rhizines around the margins. A distinct lower cortex is lacking, so the fungal tissue merges almost imperceptibly with the substratum. The algal partner is a minute, single-celled green alga (chlorococcoid type) measuring less than 10 micrometres (μm) across, distributed in a thin layer immediately beneath the upper surface of the squamules.

Fruiting bodies appear as flask-shaped perithecia that are partly embedded in the squamules yet easily spotted because their walls are heavily carbonised, giving a dull coal-black sheen. Inside, eight ascospores develop in each ascus; the mature spores are colourless, smooth, and broadly ellipsoid to somewhat spindle-shaped or club-shaped, typically 15–21 × 7–9 μm. Asexual reproduction is mediated by pycnidia of the Staurothele type—structures with a single central cavity lined by bottle-shaped cells that produce slender, usually curved conidia about 6–8 μm long. The combination of a scale-thallus, coal-black perithecial wall, and these distinctive, unilocular pycnidia sets the Mediterranean species A. virescens apart from superficially similar lichen genera.

== Species ==
- Anthracocarpon andinum M.Prieto, Aragón & Breuss (2008)
- Anthracocarpon caribaeum Breuss (1999)
- Anthracocarpon virescens (Zahlbr.) Breuss (1996)
