= Awasthiella =

Scientific classification
- Domain: Eukaryota
- Kingdom: Fungi
- Division: Ascomycota
- Class: Eurotiomycetes
- Order: Verrucariales
- Family: Verrucariaceae
- Genus: Awasthiella; Kr.P.Singh (1980)

Type species
- Awasthiella indica Kr.P.Singh (1980)

Genus of fungi

Awasthiella is a genus of fungi in the family Verrucariaceae. A monotypic genus, it contains the single species Awasthiella indica.
