= Placothelium =

Scientific classification
- Domain: Eukaryota
- Kingdom: Fungi
- Division: Ascomycota
- Class: Eurotiomycetes
- Order: Verrucariales
- Family: Verrucariaceae
- Genus: Placothelium; Müll. Arg.

Type species
- Placothelium staurothelioides Müll. Arg.

Genus of fungi

Placothelium is a genus of lichenized fungi in the family Verrucariaceae. A monotypic genus, it contains the single species Placothelium staurothelioides.
