= Nesothele =

Scientific classification
- Domain: Eukaryota
- Kingdom: Fungi
- Division: Ascomycota
- Class: Eurotiomycetes
- Order: Verrucariales
- Family: Verrucariaceae
- Genus: Nesothele; Orange (2022)

Type species
- Nesothele glebulosa Orange (2022)

Species
- N. glebulosa N. globosa N. hymenogonia N. rugulosa N. succedens

Genus of lichens

Nesothele is a genus of lichen-forming fungi in the family Verrucariaceae. It has five species. The genus was circumscribed by the British lichenologist Alan Orange in 2022, with Nesothele glebulosa assigned as the type species. This species, newly described along with the genus, is found in Nepal.

Nesothele is closely related to the genus Staurothele, appearing as a sister group in molecular phylogenetics analysis. Nesothele is characterized by a thallus with a growth form that is crustose to squamulose. Nesothele contains algae in the hymenium, a unique aspect that contributes to its identification. Each ascus typically contains 4–8 colourless, muriform ascospores, helping to distinguish Nesothele from other related genera.

== Species ==
As of December 2023, Species Fungorum (in the Catalogue of Life) accepts five species of Nesothele.

- Nesothele glebulosa Orange (2022)
- Nesothele globosa (H.Harada & Li S.Wang) Orange (2022)
- Nesothele hymenogonia (Nyl.) Orange (2022)
- Nesothele rugulosa (A.Massal.) Orange (2022)
- Nesothele succedens (Rehm) Orange (2022)
