= Thelidiopsis =

Scientific classification
- Domain: Eukaryota
- Kingdom: Fungi
- Division: Ascomycota
- Class: Eurotiomycetes
- Order: Verrucariales
- Family: Verrucariaceae
- Genus: Thelidiopsis; Vain.

Type species
- Thelidiopsis robinsonii Vain.

Genus of fungi

Thelidiopsis is a genus of fungi in the family Verrucariaceae.
