= Servitia =

Scientific classification
- Domain: Eukaryota
- Kingdom: Fungi
- Division: Ascomycota
- Class: Eurotiomycetes
- Order: Verrucariales
- Family: Verrucariaceae
- Genus: Servitia; M.S. Christ. & Alstrup
- Species: S. inconspicuum

Binomial name
- Servitia inconspicuum (Lynge) M.S. Christ. & Alstrup

Synonyms
- Dermatocarpon inconspicuum Lynge

Genus of fungi

Servitia is a genus of fungi in the family Verrucariaceae. A monotypic genus, it contains the single species Servitia inconspicuum (Lynge) M.S. Christ. & Alstrup. It was circumscribed in Alstrup & Hansen, Graphis Scripta vol.12 (2) on page 41 in 2001.

The genus name of Servitia is in honour of Miroslav Servít (1886–1959), who was a Czech teacher, botanist (Bryology, Mykology and Lichenology), who taught at various agricultural Research stations and schools.
