= Involucropyrenium =

Scientific classification
- Domain: Eukaryota
- Kingdom: Fungi
- Division: Ascomycota
- Class: Eurotiomycetes
- Order: Verrucariales
- Family: Verrucariaceae
- Genus: Involucropyrenium; Breuss (1996)

Type species
- Involucropyrenium waltheri (Kremp.) Breuss (1996)

Species
- I. breussii I. llimonae I. nuriense I. pusillum I. romeanum I. sbarbaronis I. terrigenum I. tremniacense I. waltheri

Genus of lichens

Involucropyrenium is a genus of lichens in the family Verrucariaceae. It has 10 species. Species in this genus are characterised by their minute, scale-like growth form and distinctive reproductive structures capped with dark sheaths. Most of the ten recognised species were described relatively recently, with several new species added as recently as 2021.

== Taxonomy ==
The genus was circumscribed by the Austrian lichenologist Othmar Breuss in 1996, with Involucropyrenium waltheri assigned as the type species.

== Description ==
Involucropyrenium species have a minute but robust body (thallus) that consists of tiny, overlapping squamules—scale-like lobes—which in some taxa coalesce into a thin crust. These squamules are anchored to rock or bark by a mesh of colourless to brown, root-like fungal threads (rhizoidal hyphae). The photosynthetic partner (photobiont) is a unicellular green alga of the chlorococcoid type. An upper cortex only 10–30 micrometres (μm) thick overlies the algal layer; it is uneven, poorly separated from the tissue beneath, and built from small, polygonal cells 5–8 μm across. A distinct lower cortex is absent, so the hyphae merge directly into the substratum.

Reproduction takes place in perithecia—flask-shaped fruiting bodies that push up between the squamules. Each perithecium is capped by an involucrellum, a dark sheath that may cover just the apex, half-wrap the wall, or surround it entirely. The perithecial wall (exciple) comprises elongated cells arranged parallel to the surface; it is often darkened around the ostiole—the pore through which spores exit—while the lower portion ranges from pale to blackish. Only short ostiolar threads (periphyses) occupy the cavity; the interascal filaments seen in many lichens are lacking. The spore sacs (asci) are club-shaped, thin-walled, non-amyloid (they do not stain blue in iodine), and contain eight colourless, single-celled ascospores arranged in two rows. The spores are broadly ellipsoidal to ovoid.

No specialised asexual structures (conidiomata) have been observed, and thin-layer chromatography has yet to detect any secondary metabolites.

== Species ==
As of June 2025, Species Fungorum (in the Catalogue of Life) accepts 10 species of Involucropyrenium:

- Involucropyrenium altimontanum Breuss & Türk (2021)
- Involucropyrenium breussii A.B.Gromakova & S.Y.Kondr. (2017)
- Involucropyrenium llimonae (Etayo, Nav.-Ros. & Breuss) Breuss (2004)
- Involucropyrenium nuriense (Nav.-Ros. & Breuss) Breuss (2004)
- Involucropyrenium pusillum Breuss & Türk (2004)
- Involucropyrenium romeanum (B.de Lesd.) Breuss (2016)
- Involucropyrenium sbarbaronis (Servít) Breuss (1996)
- Involucropyrenium terrigenum (Zschacke) Breuss (1996)
- Involucropyrenium tremniacense (A.Massal.) Breuss (1996)
- Involucropyrenium waltheri (Kremp.) Breuss (1996)
