= Clauzadella =

Scientific classification
- Domain: Eukaryota
- Kingdom: Fungi
- Division: Ascomycota
- Class: Eurotiomycetes
- Order: Verrucariales
- Family: Verrucariaceae
- Genus: Clauzadella; Nav.-Ros. & Cl.Roux (1996)
- Species: C. gordensis

Binomial name
- Clauzadella gordensis Nav.-Ros. & Cl.Roux (1996)

Single-species genus of fungus

Clauzadella is a genus of fungi in the family Verrucariaceae. A monotypic genus, it contains the single species Clauzadella gordensis, discovered in France and described as new to science in 1996 by Pere Navarro-Rosinés and Claude Roux.

The genus name Clauzadella honours F.J. Georges Clauzade (1914–2002), a French teacher and botanist (Mycology and Lichenology).
