= Sporodictyon =

Scientific classification
- Domain: Eukaryota
- Kingdom: Fungi
- Division: Ascomycota
- Class: Eurotiomycetes
- Order: Verrucariales
- Family: Verrucariaceae
- Genus: Sporodictyon; A.Massal. (1852)

Type species
- Sporodictyon schaererianum A.Massal. (1852)

Genus of fungi

Sporodictyon is a genus of crustose lichens in the family Verrucariaceae. It has 10 species. Most species grow on rocks, although some have been recorded overgrowing soil and mosses.

== Taxonomy ==
The genus was circumscribed in 1852 by Italian lichenologist Abramo Bartolommeo Massalongo, with Sporodictyon schaererianum assigned as the type species. Until fairly recently, the genus was usually included in Polyblastia, which is a conserved name. As a result of molecular phylogenetic work published in 2008, the genus was resurrected by Sanja Savić and Leif Tibell for three species that formed a monophyletic clade, and which included the type species: S. cruentum, S. schaererianum, and S. terrestre. Several molecular phylogenetic-based publications have shown that characters traditionally used to separate taxa in the Verrucariaceae, namely spore septation and growth form, are not always reliable for representing monophyletic groups at generic and higher ranks. Historically, descriptions of Sprodictyon species have relied heavily on the following characters: thallus development, size of perithecia, structure of the involucrellum (the upper, often exposed covering external to the excipulum), and the size and colour of ascospores. However, the morphological variability of species, and sometimes ambiguous generic concepts means that the taxonomy of this group of species has been difficult. Following the molecular work, Savić and Tibell found that ascoma size, spore pigmentation, spore size, and thallus structure are the most useful features for species recognition in Sporodictyon.

== Description ==
Sprodictyon lichens have a grey, greenish grey or brownish crust-like thallus of variable thickness. The perithecia measure 0.4–1.1 mm in diameter, and are hemispherical. The involucrellum is well developed, and is fused to the excipulum in its upper parts. The asci are variably sized (even in the same specimen), with reported dimension ranging from 105 to 236 by 34–118 μm; they typically have eight spores (although sometimes contain fewer). Ascospores are ellipsoidal, to curved with one wider end, to ovoid; they measure 39–84 by 19–47 μm. The colour of mature spores ranges from yellowish to medium brown to dark brown. Spore are muriform, meaning they are divided into smaller internal compartment by transverse and longitudinal septa.

== Species ==
As of July 2022, Species Fungorum (in the Catalogue of Life) accepts 10 species of Sprodictyon.

- Sporodictyon arcticum Savić & Tibell (2009) – Arctic
- Sporodictyon cruentum (Körb.) Körb. (1863) – Europe; Faeroe Islands; Iceland
- Sporodictyon hegetschweileri (Nägeli) Hepp ex Hazsl. (1884)
- Sporodictyon henschelianum (Körb.) Körb. (1863)
- Sporodictyon minutum Savić & Tibell (2009) – Northern Europe
- Sporodictyon schaererianum A.Massal. (1852) – Europe; American Arctic
- Sporodictyon terrestre (Th.Fr.) Savić & Tibell (2008) – Europe; Arctic
- Sporodictyon theleodes Th.Fr. (1861)
- Sporodictyon turicense G.Winter (1877)
- Sporodictyon verrucosoareolatum (Schaer.) Stizenb. (1862)

These are species that were formerly in Sporodictyon, but are now classified in other genera:

- Sporodictyon aurantiacum Trevis. (1860) = Anthracothecium aurantiacum
- Sporodictyon confine (Nyl.) Trevis. (1860) = Pyrenula confinis
- Sporodictyon cupulare (A.Massal.) Trevis. (1860) = Polyblastia cupularis
- Sporodictyon dermatodes (A.Massal.) Trevis. (1860) = Polyblastia dermatodes
- Sporodictyon globiferum (Eschw.) Trevis. (1860) = Pyrenula globifera
- Sporodictyon ochraceoflavum (Nyl.) Trevis. (1860) = Pyrenula ochraceoflava
- Sporodictyon rufum (A.Massal.) Trevis. (1860) = Staurothele rufa
- Sporodictyon rupifragum (A.Massal.) Trevis. (1860) = Staurothele rupifraga
- Sporodictyon sericeum (A.Massal.) Trevis. (1860) = Julella sericea
- Sporodictyon variolosum (Pers.) Trevis. (1860) = Anthracothecium variolosum
- Sporodictyon tristiculum (Nyl.) Dalla Torre & Sarnth. (1902) = Agonimia tristicula

Sporodictyon clandestinum Arnold (1871) was shown to be part of the largely unresolved Thelidium clade.
