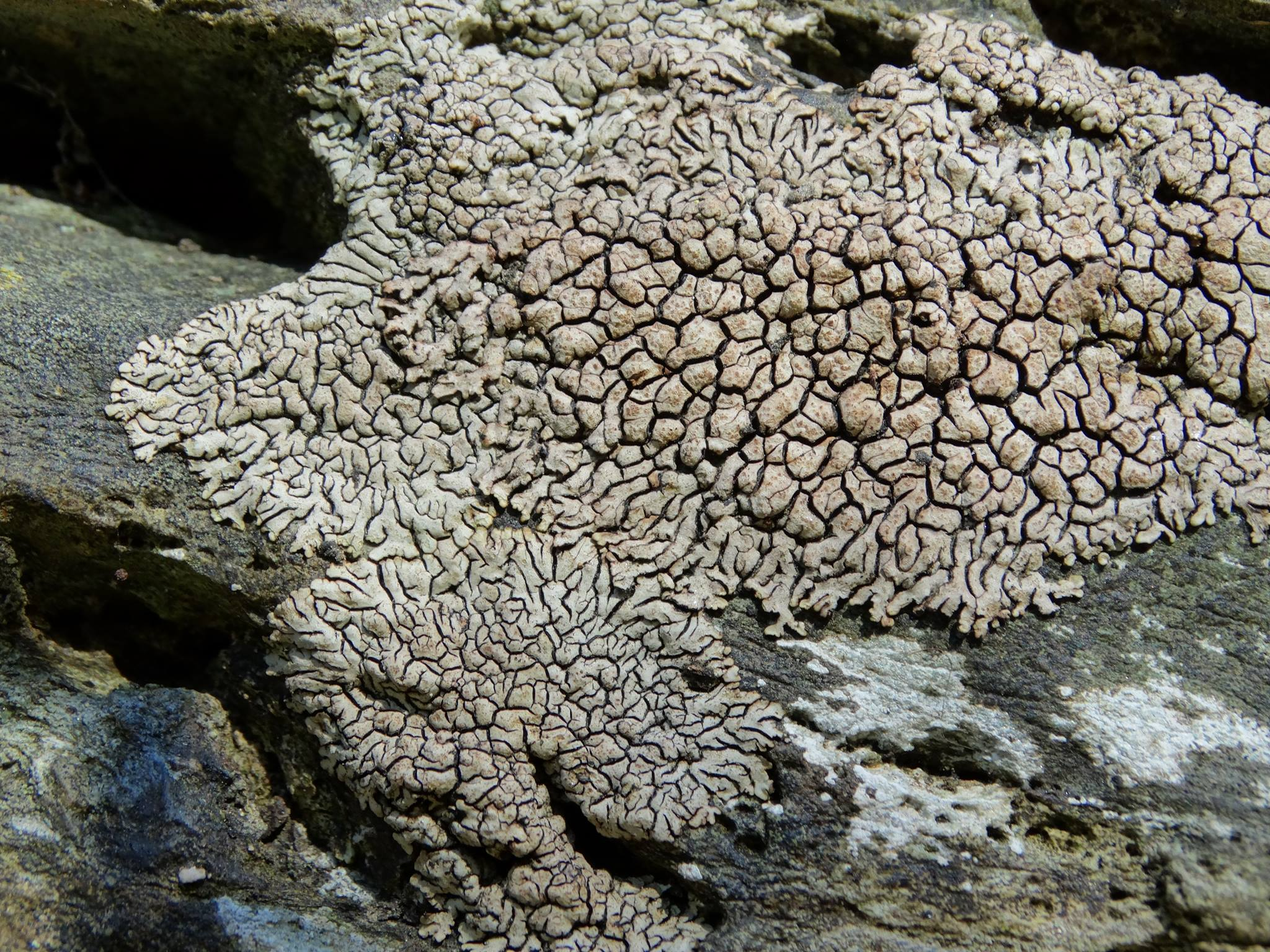
- Placopyrenium bucekii

Scientific classification
- Domain: Eukaryota
- Kingdom: Fungi
- Division: Ascomycota
- Class: Eurotiomycetes
- Order: Verrucariales
- Family: Verrucariaceae
- Genus: Placopyrenium; Breuss (1987)

Type species
- Placopyrenium bucekii (Nádv. & Servít) Breuss (1987)

= Placopyrenium =

Genus of lichen

Placopyrenium is a genus of saxicolous (rock-dwelling), crustose lichens in the family Verrucariaceae.

== Taxonomy ==
The genus was circumscribed in 1987 by the Austrian lichenologist Othmar Breuss. He assigned Placopyrenium bucekii as the type species.

== Description ==
The genus Placopyrenium is characterised by its epilithic (growing on rocks) thallus, which is thick and distinctly patterned, breaking into areoles (small, island-like sections) or squarrose-areolate (with scale-like, spreading areoles). These areoles have a unique shape, being noticeably narrowed at their base and extending into elongated stipes (stalks), which are ashen in colour on the upper surface due to a protective epinecral layer, while the underside is black. The thallus lacks rhizohyphae (root-like hyphae) and the stipes are directly attached to the substrate.

The entire thallus is composed of cells that are either angular or rounded, measuring 5–10 μm in diameter, forming a structure that is nearly paraplectenchymatous, meaning the cells are closely packed together. The areolae's base and sides are enveloped in a carbonaceous (blackened) cortical layer, providing durability and protection.

In terms of reproductive structures, Placopyrenium develops perithecia (fruiting bodies) within the thallus. These perithecia lack an involucrellum (an outer layer or envelope). The asci (spore-producing structures) within the perithecia are clavate, meaning they are shaped like a club. The spores produced in these asci are arranged in two rows (biseriate), and are either ellipsoidal or ovoid-oblong in shape. These spores are colourless and typically simple, although they are often uniseptate, meaning they have a single internal division (septum). Additionally, the genus produces short, rod-shaped conidia (asexual spores).

== Species ==
- Placopyrenium ariyanense Moniri & Breuss (2017) – Iran
- Placopyrenium breussii Cl.Roux & Gueidan (2011) – Europe
- Placopyrenium bucekii (Nádv. & Servít) Breuss (1987)
- Placopyrenium bullatum Aptroot & Yazıcı (2012) – Turkey
- Placopyrenium caeruleopulvinum (J.W.Thomson) Breuss (2002)
- Placopyrenium cinereoatratum (Degel.) Orange (2009) – Europe
- Placopyrenium coloradoense Breuss (2009)
- Placopyrenium conforme Breuss (2009)
- Placopyrenium formosum Orange (2009) – Europe
- Placopyrenium heppioides (Zahlbr.) Breuss (2002)
- Placopyrenium insuetum Breuss (2000)
- Placopyrenium iranicum Breuss (2009)
- Placopyrenium stanfordii (Herre) K.Knudsen (2006)
- Placopyrenium tatrense (Vězda) Breuss (1990)
- Placopyrenium trachyticum (Hazsl.) Breuss (1987)
- Placopyrenium zahlbruckneri (Hasse) Breuss (2002)
