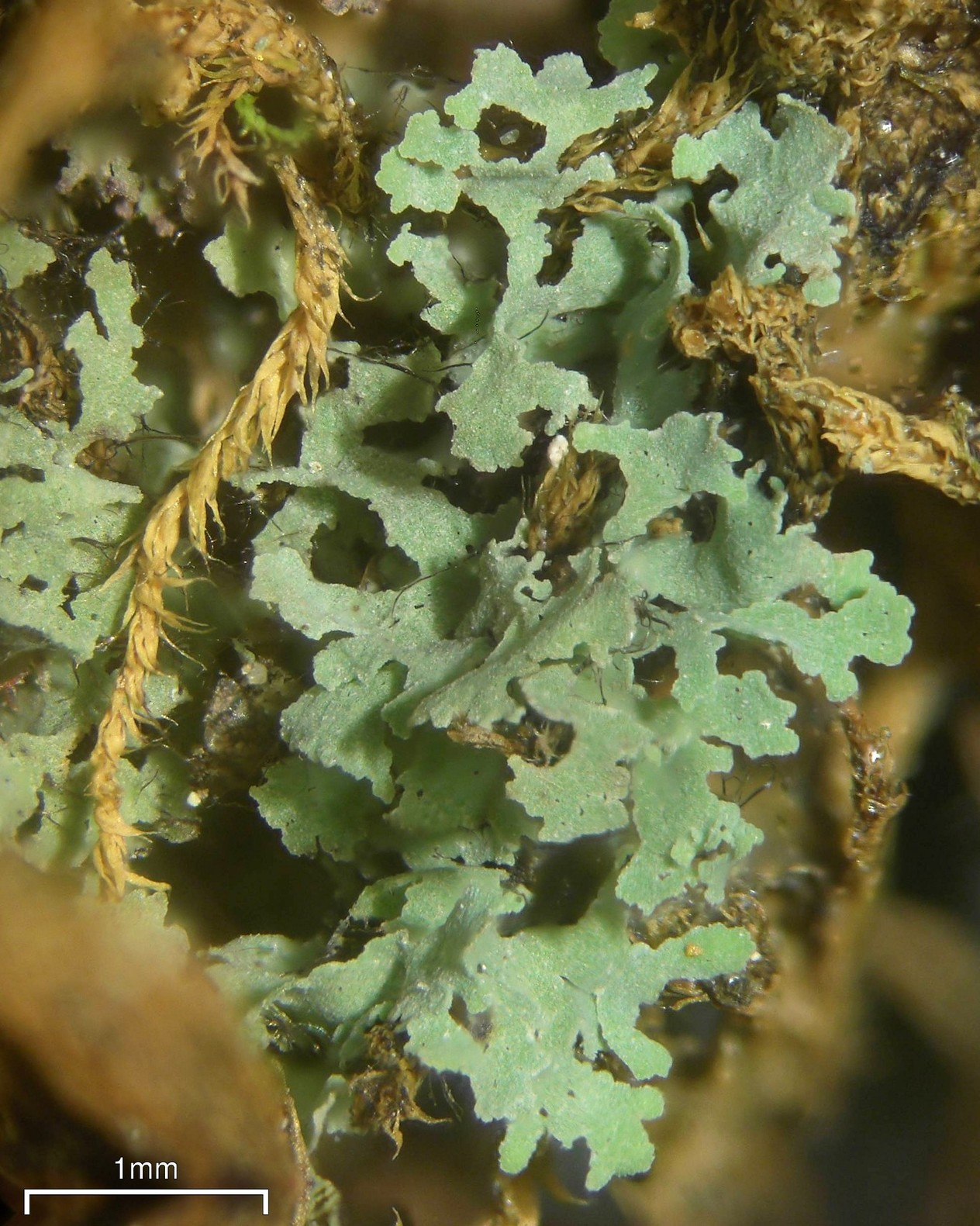

Conservation status
- Apparently Secure (NatureServe)

Scientific classification
- Domain: Eukaryota
- Kingdom: Fungi
- Division: Ascomycota
- Class: Eurotiomycetes
- Order: Verrucariales
- Family: Verrucariaceae
- Genus: Flakea; O.E.Erikss. (1992)
- Species: F. papillata

Binomial name
- Flakea papillata O.E.Erikss. (1992)

= Flakea =

Single-species lichen genus

Flakea is a genus of lichenized fungi in the family Verrucariaceae. It is a monotypic genus, containing the single species Flakea papillata.
