= Norrlinia =

Scientific classification
- Domain: Eukaryota
- Kingdom: Fungi
- Division: Ascomycota
- Class: Eurotiomycetes
- Order: Verrucariales
- Family: Verrucariaceae
- Genus: Norrlinia; Theiss. & Syd. (1918)

Type species
- Norrlinia peltigericola (Nyl.) Theiss. & Syd. (1918)

Species
- N. peltigericola N. medoborensis

Genus of fungi of the family Verrucariaceae

Norrlinia is a genus of two species of fungi in the family Verrucariaceae. The genus was circumscribed by Ferdinand Theissen and Hans Sydow in 1918. The genus name honours the Finnish botanist Johan Petter Norrlin. Both species are lichenicolous, meaning they parasitise lichens. The host of both fungi is the foliose genus Peltigera.

== Species ==
- Norrlinia medoborensis S.Y.Kondr. (1995)
- Norrlinia peltigericola (Nyl.) Theiss. & Syd. (1918)

The taxon once known as Norrlinia trypetheliza (Nyl.) Vain. (1921) is now Cercidospora trypetheliza.
