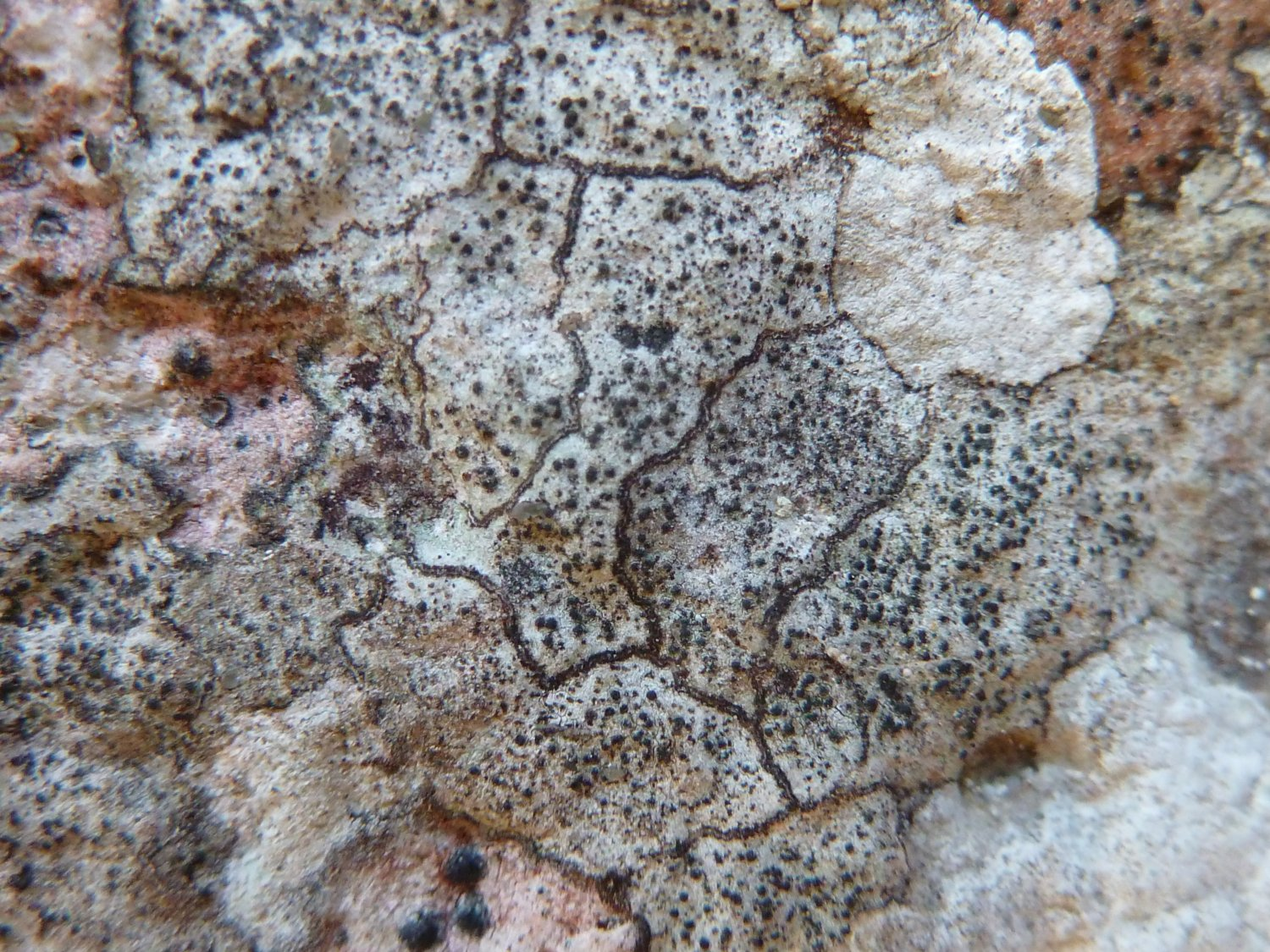
- Parabagliettoa cyanea in Buoux, France

Scientific classification
- Domain: Eukaryota
- Kingdom: Fungi
- Division: Ascomycota
- Class: Eurotiomycetes
- Order: Verrucariales
- Family: Verrucariaceae
- Genus: Parabagliettoa; Gueidan & Cl.Roux (2009)

Type species
- Parabagliettoa dufourii (DC.) Gueidan & Cl.Roux (2009)

= Parabagliettoa =

Genus of lichen

Parabagliettoa is a genus of crustose lichens in the family Verrucariaceae. It has 3 species. The genus was circumscribed in 2009 by Cécile Gueidan and Claude Roux, with Parabagliettoa dufourii assigned as the type species.

== Species ==
- Parabagliettoa cyanea (A.Massal.) Gueidan & Cl.Roux (2009)
- Parabagliettoa disjuncta (Arnold) Krzew. (2012)
- Parabagliettoa dufourii (DC.) Gueidan & Cl.Roux (2009)
