= Plurisperma =

Scientific classification
- Domain: Eukaryota
- Kingdom: Fungi
- Division: Ascomycota
- Class: Eurotiomycetes
- Order: Verrucariales
- Family: Verrucariaceae
- Genus: Plurisperma; Sivan.

Type species
- Plurisperma dalbergiae Sivan.

Genus of fungi

Plurisperma is a genus of fungi in the family Verrucariaceae; according to the 2007 Outline of Ascomycota, the placement in this family is uncertain. A monotypic genus, it contains the single species Plurisperma dalbergiae. The family Verrucariaceae is somewhat toxic to mammals due to the presence of vulpinic acid.
