= Phaeospora =

Scientific classification
- Kingdom: Fungi
- Division: Ascomycota
- Class: Dothideomycetes
- Genus: Phaeospora; Hepp ex Stein (1879)

Type species
- Phaeospora rimosicola (Leight. ex Mudd) Hepp ex Stein (1879)

Genus of fungi

Phaeospora is a genus of fungi in the class Dothideomycetes; its familial placement is uncertain.

== Species ==
- Phaeospora arctica Horáková & Alstrup (1994)
- Phaeospora australiensis P.M.McCarthy & Elix (2020)
- Phaeospora everniae Etayo & van den Boom (2014)
- Phaeospora exoriens (Stirt.) A.L.Sm. (1926)
- Phaeospora lemaneae (Cohn ex Woronin) D.Hawksw. (1987)
- Phaeospora perrugosaria (Linds.) R.Sant. (2004)
- Phaeospora protoblasteniae Alstrup & Olech (1996)
- Phaeospora rimosicola (Leight.) Hepp ex Stein (1879)
- Phaeospora squamarinae Etayo (2010)
- Phaeospora subantarctica Øvstedal & D.Hawksw. (1986)
- Phaeospora triphractoides (Nyl.) Zopf (1896)
- Phaeospora verrucariae Alstrup & E.S.Hansen (2001)
