= Coccobotrys (alga) =

Scientific classification
- Kingdom: Plantae
- Division: Chlorophyta
- Class: Chlorophyceae
- Order: Chaetophorales
- Family: Chaetophoraceae
- Genus: Coccobotrys; R. Chodat

Species
- Coccobotrys mucosus; Coccobotrys verrucariae

Genus of algae

Coccobotrys is a genus of green algae in the family Chaetophoraceae.
