= Johannes M. Norman =

Norwegian botanist

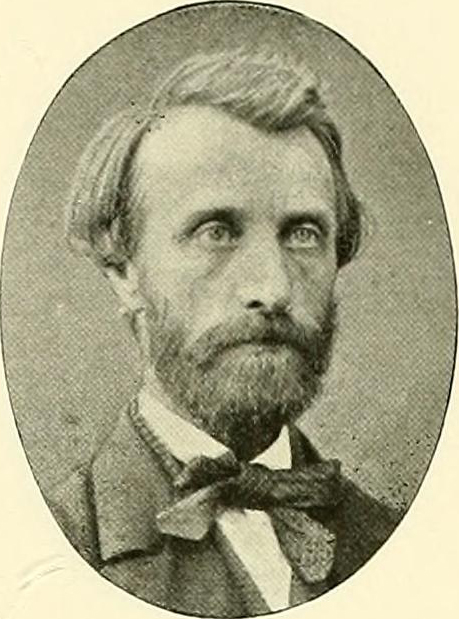
- Johannes Musæus Norman
- Born: 26 October 1823; Asker, Norway
- Died: 15 January 1903 (aged 79); Christiania, Norway
- Citizenship: Norway
- Known for: Botanical studies
- Awards: Government scholar
- Scientific career
- Fields: Botany

Johannes Musæus Norman (1823–1903) was a Norwegian botanist, trained as a medical doctor.

Norman was the son of a priest, took artium in 1840 and graduated in medicine in 1847. After a short time as a military doctor in the First Schleswig War, he worked from 1849–1857 exclusively with botany. Partly on exploration trips in Gudbrandsdalen, in Western Norway and in Western Finnmark; partly during further education in Paris and Vienna and partly as a research fellow at University of Oslo. He also completed this chapter of his life, and trained as a forester in 1858–1860, in Aschaffenburg, Bavaria. Upon his return, he was appointed Forester in Troms and Finnmark, a position he held from 1860–1876. He is credited for introducing the lichen term campylidium in an 1872 publication.

== See also ==
- Category:Taxa named by Johannes M. Norman
