= Verrucariopsis =

Scientific classification
- Kingdom: Fungi
- Division: Ascomycota
- Class: Eurotiomycetes
- Order: Verrucariales
- Family: Verrucariaceae
- Genus: Verrucariopsis; Gueidan, Monnat & Cl.Roux (2022)

Type species
- Verrucariopsis suaedae Gueidan, Monnat & Cl.Roux (2022)

Species
- V. halophila V. suaedae

Genus of lichens

Verrucariopsis is a small genus of lichen-forming fungi in the family Verrucariaceae, containing two species found in European coastal habitats. The genus was proposed in 2022 after the discovery of an unusual lichen growing on the stems of the salt marsh shrub Suaeda vera in Brittany, France. Species form a granular, greenish crust and produce flask-shaped fruiting bodies with colourless ascospores. The type species, V. suaedae, grows on shrub bark in the upper reaches of salt marshes flooded only by the highest tides, while V. halophila is primarily found on rocks in the intertidal zone. Molecular studies place the genus in a lineage of maritime lichens that includes Wahlenbergiella and Mastodia.

== Taxonomy ==
Verrucariopsis was erected in 2022 by Cécile Gueidan, Jean–Yves Monnat, and Claude Roux after a distinctive coastal lichen was collected during fieldwork in Brittany (north-western France) in December 2020, from the sheltered inner part of the aber du Conquet (Finistère). The lichen grows on the lower stems of the halophytic shrub Suaeda vera that are reached only during the highest spring tides, and the type species is Verrucariopsis suaedae. The generic name refers to its superficial resemblance to Verrucaria (with the suffix "-opsis").

Molecular phylogenetic analyses place Verrucariopsis within a lineage of Verrucariaceae that includes the maritime genera Wahlenbergiella and Mastodia; within that clade, V. suaedae is recovered as the closest relative (sister) of the marine species formerly known as Verrucaria halophila, and the two form a distinct, well-supported subclade. On that basis, the authors treated this subclade as a separate genus and proposed the new combination Verrucariopsis halophila (basionym Verrucaria halophila Nyl. ex Branth & Rostr., 1869). Morphologically, the new genus can be mistaken at first glance for some species of Verrucula, but it differs in being a non-parasitic lichen on plant bark, with a granular thallus built of algocysts (small, rounded structural units in some lichens where one or more algal cells are tightly wrapped by fungal hyphae) and a Diplosphaera photobiont, rather than a parasitic lichen growing on other lichens.

== Description ==
Species of Verrucariopsis form a crustose thallus associated with a green alga. They produce perithecioid ascomata (flask-shaped fruiting bodies), with a hamathecium made up of periphyses and short pseudoparaphyses, and bitunicate asci that open early as the outer wall undergoes gelatinization. The ascospores are simple (mostly unseptate) and colourless. Asexual reproduction occurs in pluriloculate pycnidia that produce short, rod-like (bacilliform) conidia.

The type species, V. suaedae, forms a poorly delimited crust on the bark of Suaeda vera stems, sometimes covering patches up to about 8 × 2 cm. It is green to slightly yellow-green throughout, and ranges from distinctly granular to nearly continuous, sometimes appearing cracked or weakly areolate. In section, the thallus is typically about 50–65 μm thick (locally thicker around fruiting bodies), and its granules are composed of algocysts that contain small clusters of algal cells wrapped by fungal hyphae; DNA sequencing identified the photobiont as Diplosphaera chodatii (Stichococcaceae). The ascospores are small and broadly ellipsoid to nearly spherical (typically about 5.5–7.5 × 4.5–6 μm) and have a thin perispore with a finely granular outer wall under light microscopy. Pycnidia are mostly immersed to partly emergent, and may become pluriloculate (up to eight locules). They bear lageniform (flask-shaped) conidiogenous cells and produce short bacilliform conidia (about 3.5–4.5 × about 1 μm). Compared with V. suaedae, V. halophila has a more continuous, semi-gelatinous crust with a palisade-like internal structure and a different photobiont (Pseudendoclonium). It also has larger ascomata and longer spores, and it is primarily saxicolous (rock-dwelling) in the upper midlittoral rather than corticolous (bark-dwelling) in the supralittoral.

== Habitat and distribution ==
Verrucariopsis suaedae is known only from France, from coastal Brittany (Finistère and Morbihan) and Loire-Atlantique. A later report added further sites in Morbihan and Loire-Atlantique and a single record on Tamarix arborea at Belle-Île, although most collections are from Suaeda vera stems. It grows in the upper salt marsh (upper schorre) of sheltered rias, where seawater reaches the vegetation mainly during the highest spring tides. The thallus develops on living or dead lower stems at the base of Suaeda vera tufts on muddy-sandy substrates, often mixed with small stones; storm spray may leave the stems draped with brown algal fragments. In the field it can resemble a thin green film and may be overlooked as ordinary algae; it may occur with salt marsh lichens such as Haloplaca suaedae and Lecania cyrtellina, but is uncommon on exposed outer twigs dominated by Xanthoria parietina. The Suaeda stems are often colonized by a corticolous fungus (Diatrypella), whose perithecia can rupture the lichen crust, and the thallus is frequently dotted with perithecia of the lichenicolous fungus Stigmidium verrucariopsidis.

After the initial find, it was recorded from most surveyed stations (sometimes abundantly), suggesting it is often overlooked rather than genuinely scarce; the authors suggested it may occur wherever Suaeda vera grows along French coasts (North Sea, Channel, Atlantic and Mediterranean). In these surveys it was not found on nearby woody halophytes in similar tidal settings (including Halimione portulacoides, Salicornia fruticosa, Tamarix gallica, Atriplex halimus and Euonymus japonicus), consistent with a strong preference for Suaeda as its phorophyte. The second species, V. halophila, is mainly saxicolous in the upper midlittoral, but it can also occur in estuaries on small pebbles on muddier ground just below the marsh plain.

== Species ==
- Verrucariopsis halophila (Nyl. ex Branth & Rostr.) Gueidan, Monnat & Cl.Roux (2022)
- Verrucariopsis suaedae Gueidan, Monnat & Cl.Roux (2022)
