= Hydropunctaria oceanica =

Scientific classification
- Domain: Eukaryota
- Kingdom: Fungi
- Division: Ascomycota
- Class: Eurotiomycetes
- Order: Verrucariales
- Family: Verrucariaceae
- Genus: Hydropunctaria
- Species: H. oceanica

Binomial name
- Hydropunctaria oceanica Orange (2012)

Species of lichen

Hydropunctaria oceanica is a species of saxicolous (rock-dwelling) crustose lichen in the family Verrucariaceae. Described as new to science in 2012, it is a marine lichen. It forms thin, dark grey-brown to brown-black crusts on rock surfaces along the seashore, often in areas that receive occasional rainfall. It is characterised by its roughened surface texture, large photobiont cells, and distinctive reproductive structures. Although similar in appearance to the common littoral zone lichen Hydropunctaria maura, with which it often grows, H. oceanica is genetically distinct. At the time of its description, it was known to occur in Wales and southwestern Ireland.

== Taxonomy ==
The lichen was formally described as a new species in 2012 by lichenologist Alan Orange. The type specimen was collected near Haverfordwest (Pembrokeshire, Wales), where it was found growing on siliceous rocks on the seashore. It has also been recorded in Ireland. The species epithet oceanica refers to its growth near the ocean. The lichen is similar in appearance, and often grows contiguously with the common and widespread littoral zone lichen Hydropunctaria maura, but is genetically distinct from that species.

== Description ==
Hydropunctaria oceanica is a crustose lichen species with distinctive structural characteristics. The lichen begins with a whitish prothallus (initial growth stage) that lacks fringe-like extensions. Its main body (thallus) grows on the surface of its substrate, forming a thin layer anout 35–100 micrometres (μm) thick. The thallus appears dark grey-brown to brown-black, occasionally with a greenish tint. The surface of the thallus contains sparse to numerous cracks, though these rarely form distinct segments (areoles) except in localizsed thicker areas. A distinct feature is the roughened surface texture created by indistinct dots (punctae) or short, winding or branched ridges that are the same colour as the thallus. These surface features measure about 20–90 by 20–40 μm, though they are often too subtle to measure precisely. The thallus gradually becomes thinner toward its margins.

The outer protective layer (pseudocortex) contains light to moderately dense brown pigmentation that does not change colour when potassium hydroxide solution (K) is applied. The algal partner (photobiont) forms a distinct layer with cells measuring roughly 25–37 by 20–33 μm. Sometimes a thin, colourless layer of collapsed cells (epinecral layer) about 4 μm thick covers the surface, though its structure is difficult to discern. The photobiont cells themselves are relatively large, measuring 50–90 by 45–80 μm. The lower portions of the thallus range from colorless to brown, with few or no living photobiont cells. Densely pigmented areas (punctae) project upward from this basal layer into the photobiont layer. These contain dark red-brown pigment that turns dark grey-brown when potassium hydroxide is applied.

The reproductive structures (perithecia) form prominent conical to hemispherical projections measuring 260–500 μm in diameter. The lower portions of these projections share the roughened texture of the thallus, while the upper portions are smooth and either match the thallus colour or appear black. The apex is rounded or slightly flattened, with the opening (ostiolar region) being inconspicuous and of the same colour. Inside, the perithecia have a well-developed protective covering (involucrellum) that merges with the dark basal tissue. The inner spore-producing chamber (exciple) measures 170–210 μm in diameter. The spore sacs (asci) each contain 8 spores and measure approximately 45–82 by 18–29 μm. The spores (ascospores) are oblong-ellipsoid in shape, measuring approximately 135–165 μm long by 70–80 μm wide, with a length-to-width ratio of about 18-23:1.

== Habitat and distribution ==
Hydropunctaria oceanica occupies seashore environments, growing on rock surfaces with gentle to steep inclines. It often inhabits areas that receive occasional light moisture from rainfall. The species typically grows alongside Hydropunctaria maura and sometimes coexists with H. orae. At the time of its original publication, its confirmed distribution was limited to four localities in the British Isles: three sites in Wales and one in southwestern Ireland.
