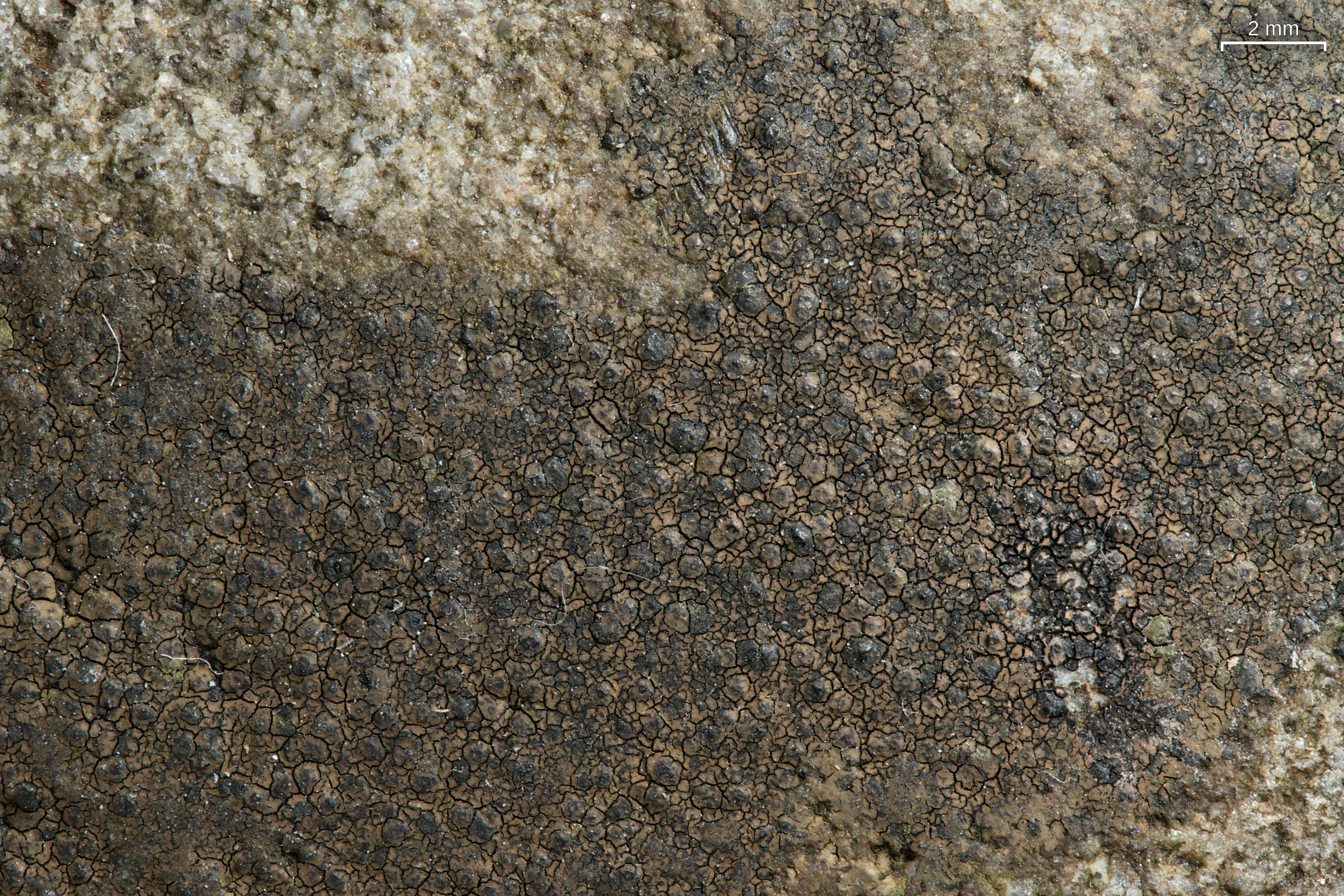

Scientific classification
- Kingdom: Fungi
- Division: Ascomycota
- Class: Eurotiomycetes
- Order: Verrucariales
- Family: Verrucariaceae
- Genus: Willeya
- Species: W. diffractella

Binomial name
- Willeya diffractella (Nyl.) Müll.Arg. (1883)

Synonyms
- List: Verrucaria diffractella Nyl. (1858); Polyblastia diffractella (Nyl.) Trevis. (1860); Staurothele diffractella (Nyl.) Tuck. (1872); Phalostauris diffractella (Nyl.) Clem. (1909); Endocarpon diffractellum (Nyl.) Gueidan & Cl.Roux (2007); Staurothele tenuissima Degel. (1942); Endocarpon tenuissimum (Degel.) Lendemer & E.A.Tripp (2013)

= Willeya diffractella =

Species of lichen

Willeya diffractella is a species of saxicolous (rock-dwelling) crustose lichen in the family Verrucariaceae. This lichen forms thin, crusty patches on rocks that break into small polygonal pieces, ranging in color from yellowish to olive or brown. It is found throughout eastern North America, from New England south to Alabama and west to Minnesota, growing on both limestone and non-limestone rocks. The species has had a complex naming history, being moved between different genera multiple times as scientists better understood its relationships to other lichens.

== Taxonomy ==
William Nylander formally described the species in 1858 as Verrucaria diffractella. His original description noted the thallus as pale fawn-colored to ash-gray-pale, moderately thick (0.25 mm), and frequently cracked in an areolate pattern. He described the perithecia as innate (embedded) within protruding thalline areoles, with a denuded black ostiole and impressed ostiolar region, while the perithecium and other parts (including the hypothallus) were black. Nylander recorded the spores as ellipsoid and muriform (wall-divided), measuring 0.018–.023 mm long by 0.010–.011 mm wide, with the conidia described as briefly oblong-small and copious within the hymenium. The type specimen was collected on micaceous schist rocks in New England by Edward Tuckerman, and Nylander noted it differed from the paler V. umbrina particularly in having eight colorless ascospores.

The species was later placed in Staurothele by Edward Tuckerman in 1872. It has also appeared in the literature as Polyblastia diffractella and Phalostauris diffractella. A multigene phylogeny showed that this crustose species is sister to Endocarpon, and on that basis it was transferred as Endocarpon diffractellum in 2007. In 2014 the genus Willeya was resurrected for crustose, pale‑spored taxa formerly sitting uneasily in Staurothele, and the name Willeya diffractella was reinstated for this species. Type material is from Brattleboro, Vermont (lectotype H‑NYL), and subsequent confirmed material includes a Missouri collection cited by both studies.

Gueidan and co‑authors also recognized W. diffractella var. flavicans, distinguished mainly by a cracked (rimose to sub‑areolate) thallus, while noting that its status needs further study.

As circumscribed by the 2014 revision, Willeya comprises crustose, epilithic lichens with a weakly differentiated upper layer (a "pseudocortex"), perithecia whose spore layer contains algal cells, and pale ascospores; W. diffractella fits this generic profile. A molecular study using internal transcribed spacer (ITS) DNA sampling 21 North American specimens recovered W. diffractella as a single, well-supported clade and showed that Endocarpon tenuissimum is nested within it; the authors therefore placed E. tenuissimum (≡ Staurothele tenuissima) in synonymy with W. diffractella. An independent ITS analysis likewise recovered E. tenuissimum nested within a monophyletic W. diffractella, supporting its treatment as a synonym. Within the W. diffractella clade there was no clear match between infraspecific groupings and either morphology or geography; the only consistent signal was substrate (calcareous vs. non-calcareous), mirroring earlier findings.

Sequencing of the ITS region across its range found no phylogeographic structuring, but specimens from calcareous substrates mostly fell into a single, well-supported lineage within W. diffractella. The authors flagged this as a promising direction for future study rather than evidence for segregate taxa.

== Description ==
The thallus is crustose and areolate—i.e., it forms a thin crust that breaks into small polygonal blocks—and ranges in color from yellowish to olive or medium brown. Its surface varies from finely cracked (rimulose) to deeply cracked and blocky (rimose-areolate) and can approach a "diffractellate" pattern; areoles may be contiguous or partly dispersed, and fertile areoles are sometimes slightly larger than sterile ones. Cracks between areoles are often darkly pigmented, and overall thallus thickness is variable.

The spore-bearing bodies (perithecia) are immersed within the areoles; the pore at the top (ostiole) may be inconspicuous or clearly raised and is typically 0.1–0.3 mm across. A comparative survey showed that much of this morphological spread occurs even within single thalli depending on light exposure and the inclination of the substrate, indicating ecological plasticity rather than hidden species.

Internally, the thallus has a palisade algal layer and the photobiont is a stichococcoid green alga of the genus Diplosphaera. Perithecia have a dark involucrellum (a sheath around the upper wall) that can flare laterally or wrap inwards toward the base of the excipulum. The excipulum is pale and sometimes darkened near the ostiole.

Asci contain 6 to 8 hyaline, muriform ascospores (colorless spores divided by many cross-walls into a brick-like pattern) measuring about 15–32 × 9–15 μm. Algal cells also occur among the spore-bearing tissues (the hymenium), a feature recorded for this species in modern treatments. In simple iodine solution the hymenial gel turns blue (I+), a reaction reported in regional floras.

At the generic level, Willeya species characteristically possess a weakly developed upper layer (a pseudocortex), and W. diffractella conforms to that pattern.

=== Similar species ===
Verrucaria fayettensis can resemble W. diffractella on limestone, but it usually has a thicker brown thallus and a conspicuous, carbonized (blackened) basal layer that breaks through the upper surface, giving the thallus a speckled, peppered look.

== Habitat and distribution ==
Willeya diffractella occurs on both calcareous rocks (limestone, dolomite) and non-calcareous lithologies (rhyolite, sandstone, micaceous schist, shale). Within North America it is an eastern endemic, from New England south to Alabama and west to Minnesota, Iowa, and Missouri. Gueidan and colleagues (2007) documented the Vermont lectotype and additional material from Missouri, confirming this range in modern treatments. Verified records span 23 U.S. states (Appalachians, Ozarks, Great Plains) and Quebec, and mapping of 133 studied specimens indicates the species is widespread and common in eastern North America. On that basis the authors considered it not of conservation concern (effectively Least Concern if assessed). In the 2014 revision, the authors remarked that among the species they placed in Willeya, all except W. diffractella were Asian or Australian, emphasizing its otherwise North American occurrence in that framework. Historical material assigned to the variety flavicans extends to Brazil and Costa Rica, but the authors cautioned that the delimitation of varieties under W. diffractella requires further study.
