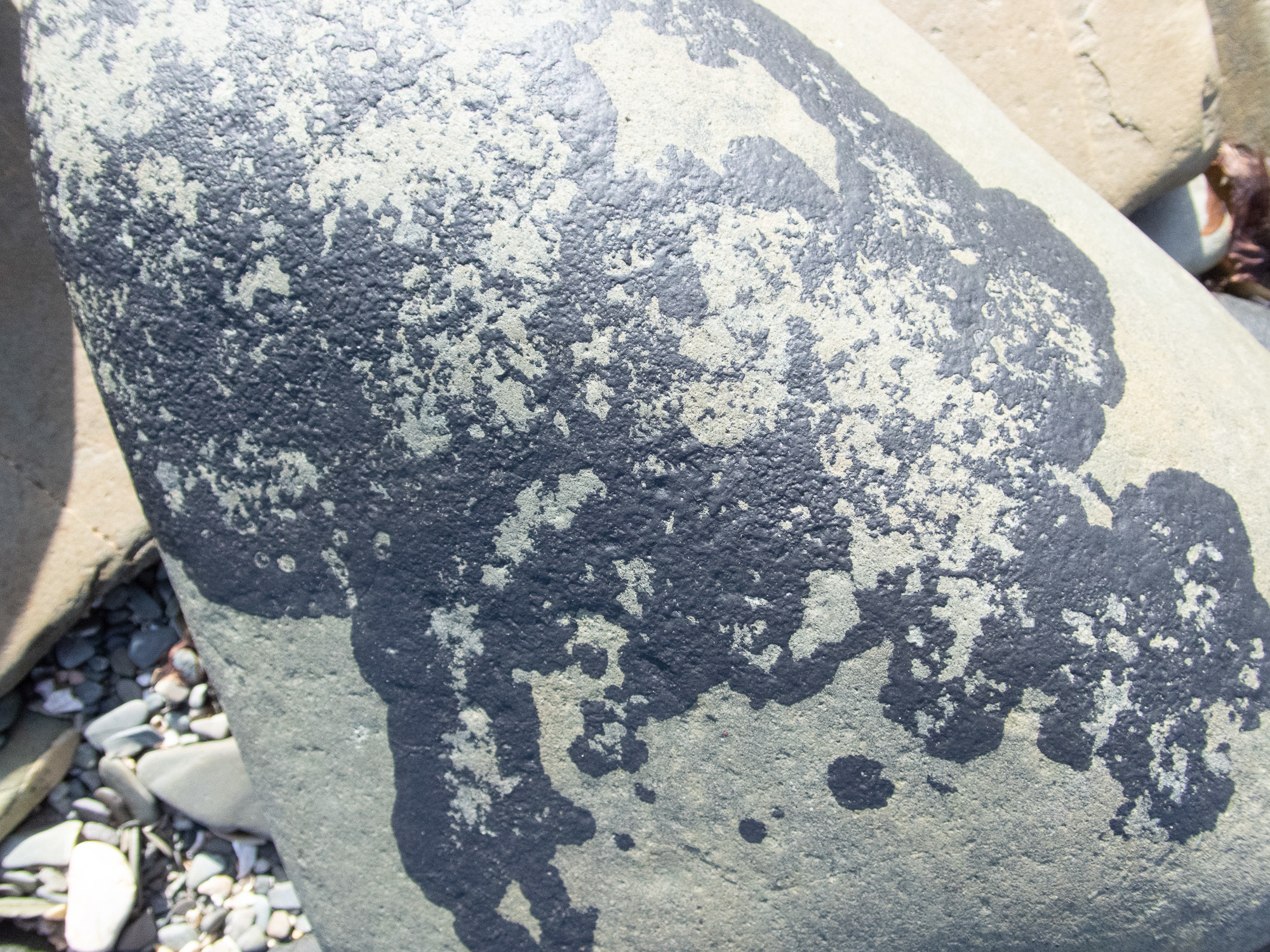
- Hydropunctaria maura

Scientific classification
- Kingdom: Fungi
- Division: Ascomycota
- Class: Eurotiomycetes
- Order: Verrucariales
- Family: Verrucariaceae
- Genus: Hydropunctaria; C.Keller, Gueidan & Thüs (2009)

Type species
- Hydropunctaria maura (Wahlenb.) C.Keller, Gueidan & Thüs (2009)

= Hydropunctaria =

Genus of lichen

Hydropunctaria is a genus of saxicolous (rock-dwelling), crustose lichens in the family Verrucariaceae. The genus includes both aquatic and amphibious species, with members that colonise either marine or freshwater habitats. The type species, Hydropunctaria maura, was formerly classified in the large genus Verrucaria. It is a widely distributed species common to littoral zones. Including the type species, six Hydropunctaria lichens are considered marine species: H. adriatica, H. amphibia, H. aractina, H. orae, and H. oceanica.

== Taxonomy ==
Hydropunctaria was circumscribed in 2009 by Christine Keller, Cécile Gueidan, and Holger Thüs, with Hydropunctaria maura assigned as the type species.

The defining feature of Hydropunctaria is its frequent development of carbonaceous structures within the thallus, which appear punctiform to columnar and can originate from an often rough and uneven involucrellum. In contrast, Wahlenbergiella species, like Wahlenbergiella striatula, have elongated, sometimes branched, black carbonaceous structures forming fingerprint-like patterns, a characteristic absent in Hydropunctaria where structures remain isolated and punctiform. Additionally, unlike the smooth involucrellum surface seen in Wahlenbergiella, Hydropunctaria typically presents an irregularly roughened surface.

== Description ==
The thallus of Hydropunctaria is crustose, with a form ranging from continuous (more or less unbroken) to rimose or areolate. The texture of the thallus is somewhat gelatinous. Documented thallus colours include yellowish-brown, green, and dark grayish olive to black. The upper cortex is only weakly separated into distinct layers; microscopically, it comprises cortical cells with a diameter typically smaller than the fungal cells from the algal layer. The uppermost layer of cortical cells, when present, often contain yellowish to brown or olive-blackish pigments; this characteristic, however, is not always consistent, as evidenced by the colourless specimens sometimes collected from shaded sites. Black dots (punctae) are sometimes visible at the surface of the thallus—more readily so in wet thalli. The layer of algal cells is not clearly differentiated from the upper cortex, although generally they are usually arranged in vertical columns, occasionally interrupted by black punctae. The medulla is paraplectenchymatous (fungal tissue with a cellular structure superficially like parenchyma of vascular plants) and is sometimes very thin or absent, often replaced by a black carbonaceous layer that interrupted by isolated black punctae or columns.

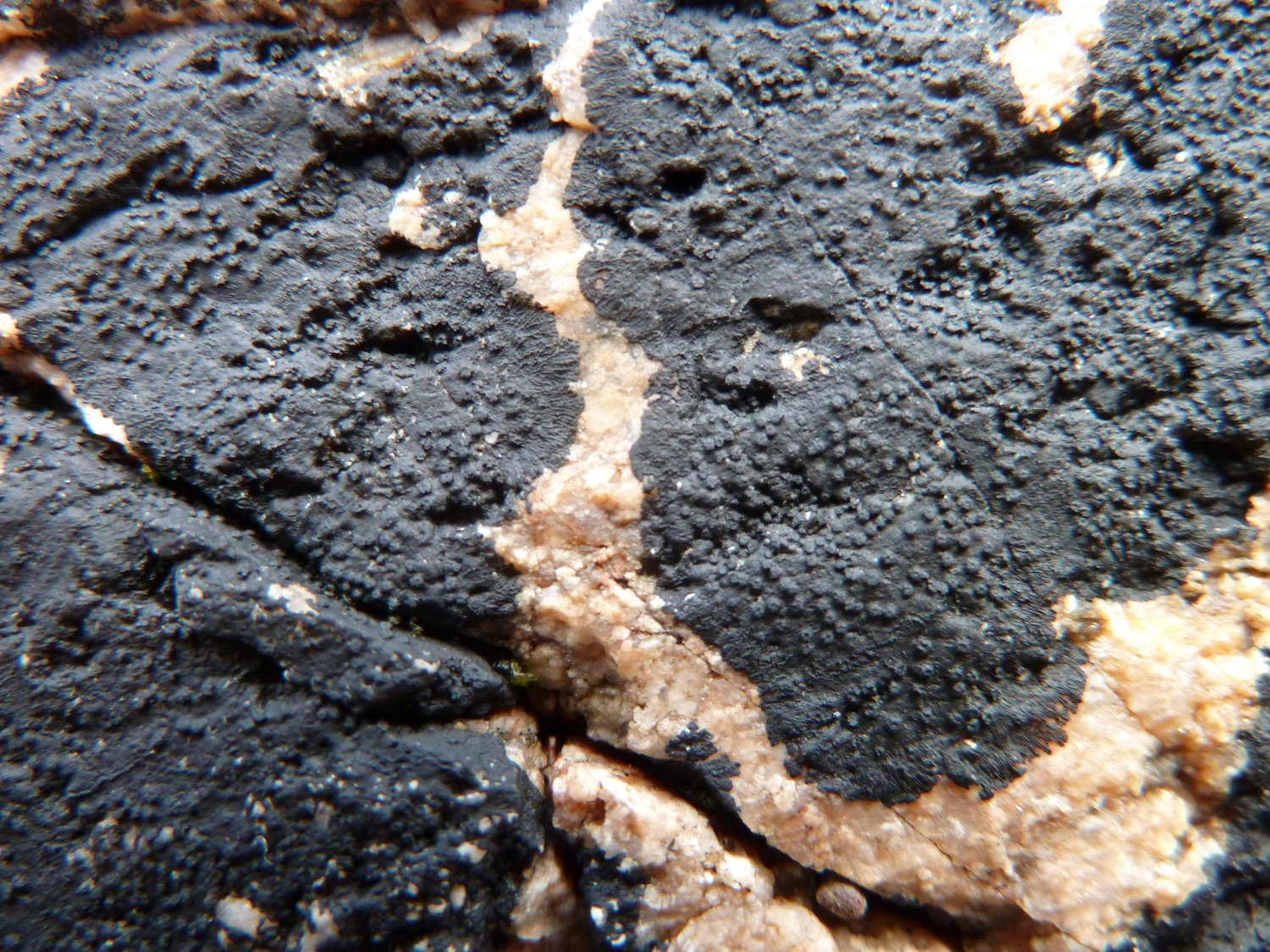
Hydropunctaria amphibia forms a thick, dark crust on seaside rocks in the spray zone.

Perithecia (flask-shaped ascomata opening by a pore, or ostiole) are immersed (or partially so) in the thallus. The involucrellum refers to the upper, often exposed covering or cap external to the excipulum and usually distinct from it. In Hydropunctaria, the involucrellum is black, often with a rough or uneven upper surface, and it can be of several forms: apical (where the involucrellum occurs only around the ostiole, but extends some distance laterally) to dimidiate (where the involucrellum covers only the upper portion of the perithecium) or entire (where the involucrellum completely surrounds the perithecium). The excipulum (the cup-shaped layer of tissue surrounding the hymenium) is either pale with a brown ostiole or completely pigmented.

Hydropunctaria species have eight-spored asci that are bitunicate (i.e., with two functional ascal wall layers). Its ascospores are simple (i.e., lacking septa), with a rounded or ellipsoid shape and a length usually more than 12 μm.

== Species ==
As of February 2024, Species Fungorum (in the Catalogue of Life) accepts 10 species of Hydropunctaria:

- Hydropunctaria adriatica (Zahlbr.) Orange (2012)
- Hydropunctaria alaskana Thüs & Pérez-Ort. (2020) – Alaska
- Hydropunctaria amphibia (Clemente) Cl.Roux (2011)
- Hydropunctaria aractina (Wahlenb.) Orange (2012)
- Hydropunctaria maura (Wahlenb.) C.Keller, Gueidan & Thüs (2009)
- Hydropunctaria nipponoamphibia H.Harada & K.Hara (2024)
- Hydropunctaria oceanica Orange (2012)
- Hydropunctaria orae Orange (2012)
- Hydropunctaria rheitrophila (Zschacke) C.Keller, Gueidan & Thüs (2009)
- Hydropunctaria scabra (Vězda) C.Keller, Gueidan & Thüs (2009)
- Hydropunctaria symbalana (Nyl.) Cl.Roux (2020)

== Species interactions ==
Lichenicolous (lichen-dwelling) lichens recorded growing on Hydropunctaria include Sirenophila ovis-atra and Flavoplaca microthallina.
