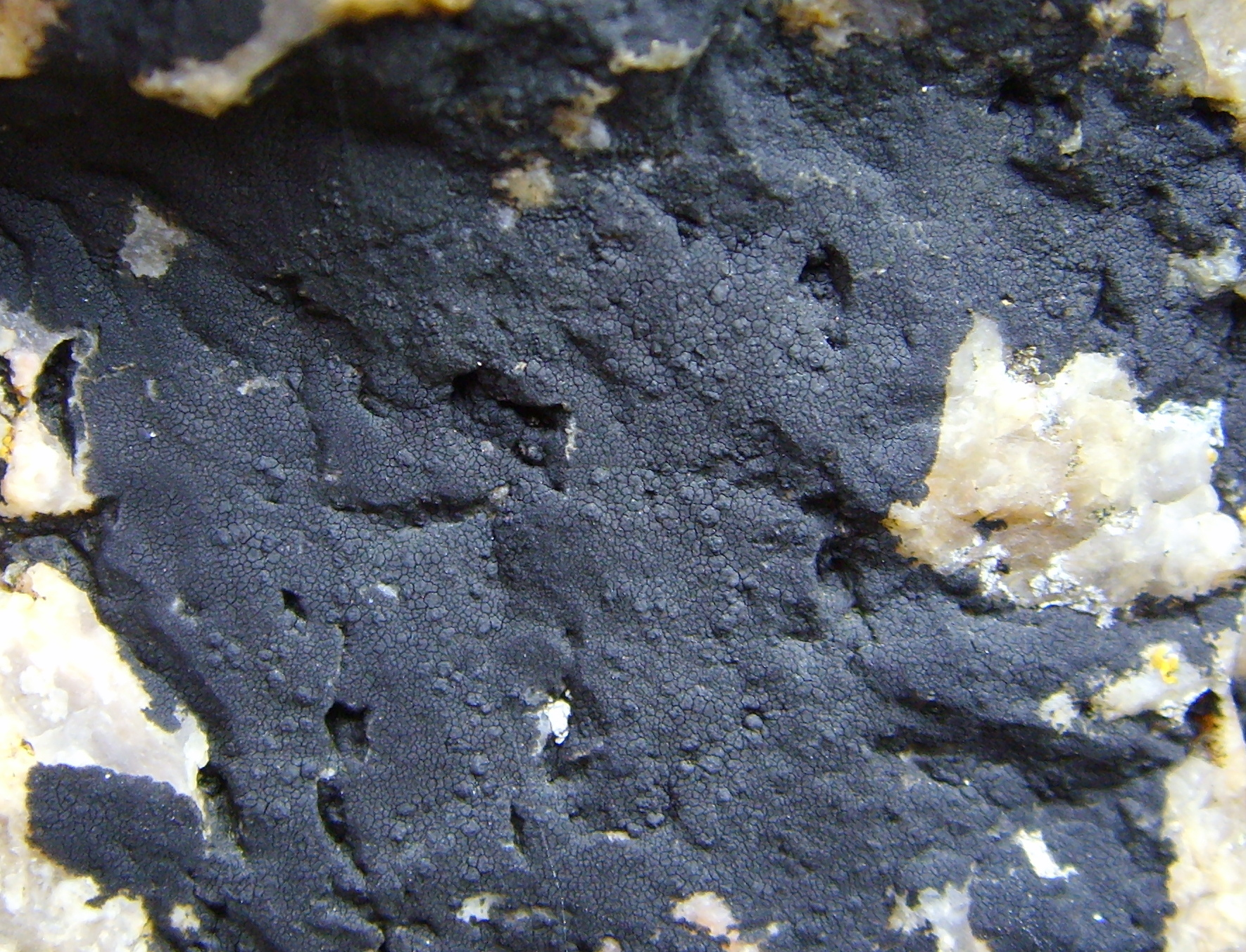

Conservation status
- Apparently Secure (NatureServe)

Scientific classification
- Kingdom: Fungi
- Division: Ascomycota
- Class: Eurotiomycetes
- Order: Verrucariales
- Family: Verrucariaceae
- Genus: Hydropunctaria
- Species: H. maura

Binomial name
- Hydropunctaria maura (Wahlenb.) C.Keller, Gueidan & Thüs (2009)

Synonyms
- Lithoicea maura (Wahlenb. ex Ach.) Zahlbr. (1886); Verrucaria maura Wahlenb. ex Ach. (1803); Verrucaria pseudomemnonia Zschacke (1924); Verrucaria scotina Wedd. (1875); Verrucaria zschackeana Erichsen (1930)

= Hydropunctaria maura =

Species of lichen

Hydropunctaria maura, still often called by the older name Verrucaria maura and commonly known as tar lichen, is a species of saxicolous (rock-dwelling), crustose lichen belonging to the family Verrucariaceae. A perennial species that does not experience seasonal variations, it is the type species of the genus Hydropunctaria. The medulla is a black basal layer that forms columns (Latin: punctae) to the upper surface and isolates the algae into pockets near the upper surface. The black band formed by H. maura can often be seen at a distance as a marker of the high water point.

== Ecology ==
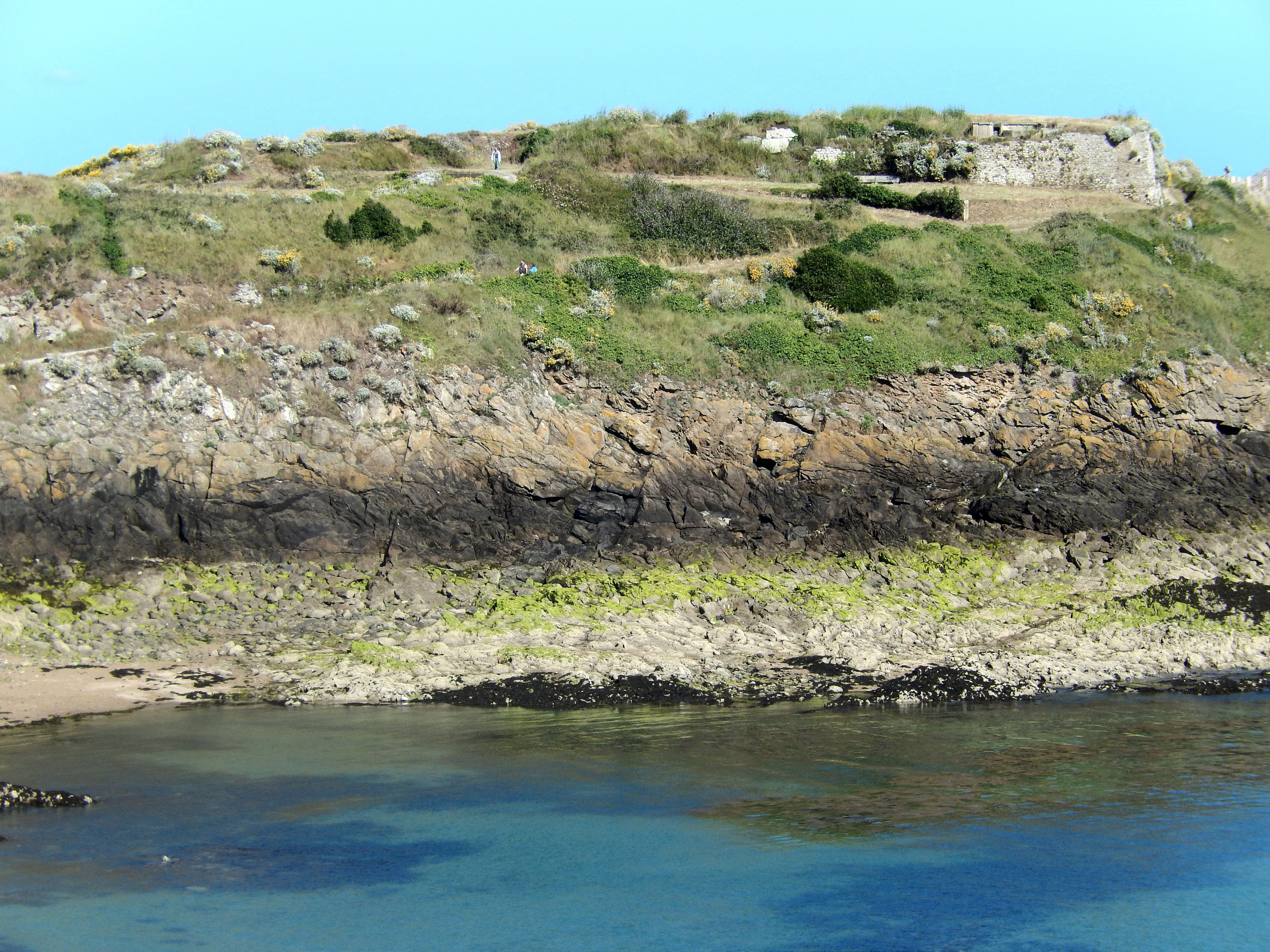
Coastal vegetation zones at Saint-Malo. Hydropunctaria maura is forming the black stripe on the upper littoral zone rocks.

Hydropunctaria maura is commonly found on hard rocks in the intertidal zone. Compared to terrestrial lichens, the species is typically located in areas of direct sunlight, suggests that it may have specific adaptations against damage from the sun. It is considered an upper littoral (supralittoral) lichen, compared to other, lower littoral lichens such as Wahlenbergiella mucosa, distinguished by environmental factors such as water availability, UV exposure, and temperature. Because of the relatively extreme conditions of the supralittoral zone, crustose lichens are the only organisms capable of colonizing these areas. H. maura effectively serves as the primary biological indicator of the extent of the zone where it is found. Both H. maura and Hydropunctaria amphibia synthesize sucrose in response to high salt concentrations.

It forms thin, matte-black crusts with the algae genus Dilabifilum as a photobiont. A study of four lichen species from southwestern Norway showed that H. maura had a greater diversity of microorganisms, greater bacterial diversity in the thalli, and a higher number of different bacterial sequences. The diversity of microorganisms is likely related to its strong marine influence. It is commonly associated with Thermoproteota (formerly Crenarchaeota). Other studies have identified Jannaschia pohangensis and Bacillus aerius, among others, as associated with Hydropunctaria maura.

The growth rate of H. maura colonies is estimated to be less than 1 mm per year. After elimination, it is estimated to take three years for the species to recolonize a substrate. Germination of the spores of this species is stimulated by seawater salinity concentrations that typically inhibit germination of spores of other lichens.

== Distribution ==
Hydropunctaria maura is one of the most widespread and abundant lichens in the European littoral zone, and has been found around the world, in extreme climes such as the Arctic and Antarctica. It has a cosmopolitan distribution, and is found on both the East and West coasts of North America, and in the Southern Hemisphere in Tasmania and New Zealand. The cyanolichen Lichina confinis is often found in the same zone as Hydropunctaria maura.
