= Willeya eminens =

Scientific classification
- Kingdom: Fungi
- Division: Ascomycota
- Class: Eurotiomycetes
- Order: Verrucariales
- Family: Verrucariaceae
- Genus: Willeya
- Species: W. eminens

Binomial name
- Willeya eminens Orange (2022)

Species of lichen

Willeya eminens is a species of crustose lichen in the family Verrucariaceae. Found in Nepal, it was described by the lichenologist Alan Orange in 2022. Its species epithet alludes to its prominent perithecia.
