= Hydropunctaria rheitrophila =

Scientific classification
- Domain: Eukaryota
- Kingdom: Fungi
- Division: Ascomycota
- Class: Eurotiomycetes
- Order: Verrucariales
- Family: Verrucariaceae
- Genus: Hydropunctaria
- Species: H. rheitrophila

Binomial name
- Hydropunctaria rheitrophila (Zschacke) C.Keller, Gueidan & Thüs (2009)

Synonyms
- Verrucaria kernstockii Zschacke (1927); Verrucaria rheitrophila Zschacke (1922); Verrucula rheitrophila (Zschacke) M.Choisy (1950)

Species of lichen

Hydropunctaria rheitrophila is a widely distributed species of crustose lichen in the family Verrucariaceae. It grows on rocks in aquatic environments, typically in streams and rivers where it colonizes silica-containing substrates that are regularly submerged or wetted. The lichen forms a thin to thick crust-like body (thallus) that ranges in colour from pale brownish green to dark green, often dotted with black spots. It is widely distributed throughout the Northern Hemisphere, particularly in Europe, North America, and Asia, with some occurrences in the Southern Hemisphere including New Zealand. Originally described in 1922 as a member of the genus Verrucaria, it was reclassified in 2009 as part of the newly established genus Hydropunctaria, which includes several aquatic lichen species.

== Taxonomy ==
It was formally described as a new species in 1922 by the German lichenologist Georg Hermann Zschacke as a species of Verrucaria. Christine Keller, Cécile Gueidan, and Holger Thüs transferred it to the newly circumscribed genus Hydropunctaria in 2009. It is one of several aquatic lichens that are in this genus.

== Description ==
Hydropunctaria rheitrophila has a whitish prothallus (initial fungal growth area) that is non-fimbriate (lacking hair-like projections). When multiple thalli grow adjacent to one another, they are often separated by thin black lines. The thallus (main body of the lichen) is thin to thick, measuring 60–140 micrometre (μm) in thickness, and grows superficially on its substrate. It has a somewhat gelatinous texture and is well-developed, typically measuring 60–95 μm thick. The surface appears even, either smooth or roughened, and is usually uncracked, though sparse cracks may sometimes be present. The thallus colour ranges from pale brownish green to olive green or dark green, and is dotted with sparse to numerous black spots.

The upper cortex (outer protective layer) is paraplectenchymatous (composed of closely packed fungal cells) but poorly defined, measuring about 20 μm in thickness. The cell walls contain dark pigmentation, ranging from yellowish brown to blackish brown in colour. The algal cells (photobiont partner) measure 8–15 μm in diameter and are arranged in more or less vertical columns throughout the thallus. The medulla (inner layer) is also paraplectenchymatous and contains intensely pigmented patches that appear as discrete black punctae (dots) or columns. A black basal layer is generally absent or present only in small areas of the thallus.

The reproductive structures of H. rheitrophila are perithecia, which may be completely immersed and visible only as black points, or they may project from the surface, depending on the thickness of the thallus. The involucrellum (protective covering of the perithecium) is highly variable, ranging from apical and little-developed to well-developed in the upper half of the excipulum, often spreading outwards and downwards. The excipulum (inner wall of the perithecium) measures 90–210 μm in width and is either colourless or partly brown. The periphysoids (sterile filaments lining the inner surface of the perithecium) measure 20–30 by 1.5–3 μm. Ascospores (sexual spores) made by H. rheitrophila are simple, colourless, and ellipsoid in shape, measuring 10–15 by 4.5–7 μm. Conidiomata (asexual reproductive structures) were not observed in the specimens described.

The photobiont partner of Hydropunctaria rheitrophila is a yellow-green alga (class Xanthophyceae, genus Heterococcus).

== Habitat and distribution ==
Hydropunctaria rheitrophila is predominantly found throughout the holarctic region, with its range extending across central and northern Eurasia, North America, Asia, and Australia. Despite its primarily Northern Hemisphere distribution, the species has also been documented in the Southern Hemisphere, specifically in New Zealand.

The species has been documented throughout various regions of the Iberian Peninsula, including Catalonia in northeastern Spain. In the Pyrenees mountains, it has been found in submerged or periodically inundated environments, particularly in mountain streams at elevations ranging from 1400 to 2900 metres.

This lichen species inhabits a specialized ecological niche, growing on submerged or frequently wetted siliceous rocks and pebbles within the lower splash zone of freshwater environments. This habitat preference reflects its adaptation to periodically inundated conditions, where it can colonisze hard silica-containing substrates that experience regular wetting.
