= Willeya irrigata =

Scientific classification
- Kingdom: Fungi
- Division: Ascomycota
- Class: Eurotiomycetes
- Order: Verrucariales
- Family: Verrucariaceae
- Genus: Willeya
- Species: W. irrigata

Binomial name
- Willeya irrigata Orange (2022)

Species of lichen

Willeya irrigata is a species of saxicolous (rock-dwelling) crustose lichen in the family Verrucariaceae. Found in Nepal, it was described by the lichenologist Alan Orange in 2022. It is characterised by a thallus that cracks into distinct dark-sided areoles, and by its relatively large ascospores, which measure 28.5–40 micrometres.
