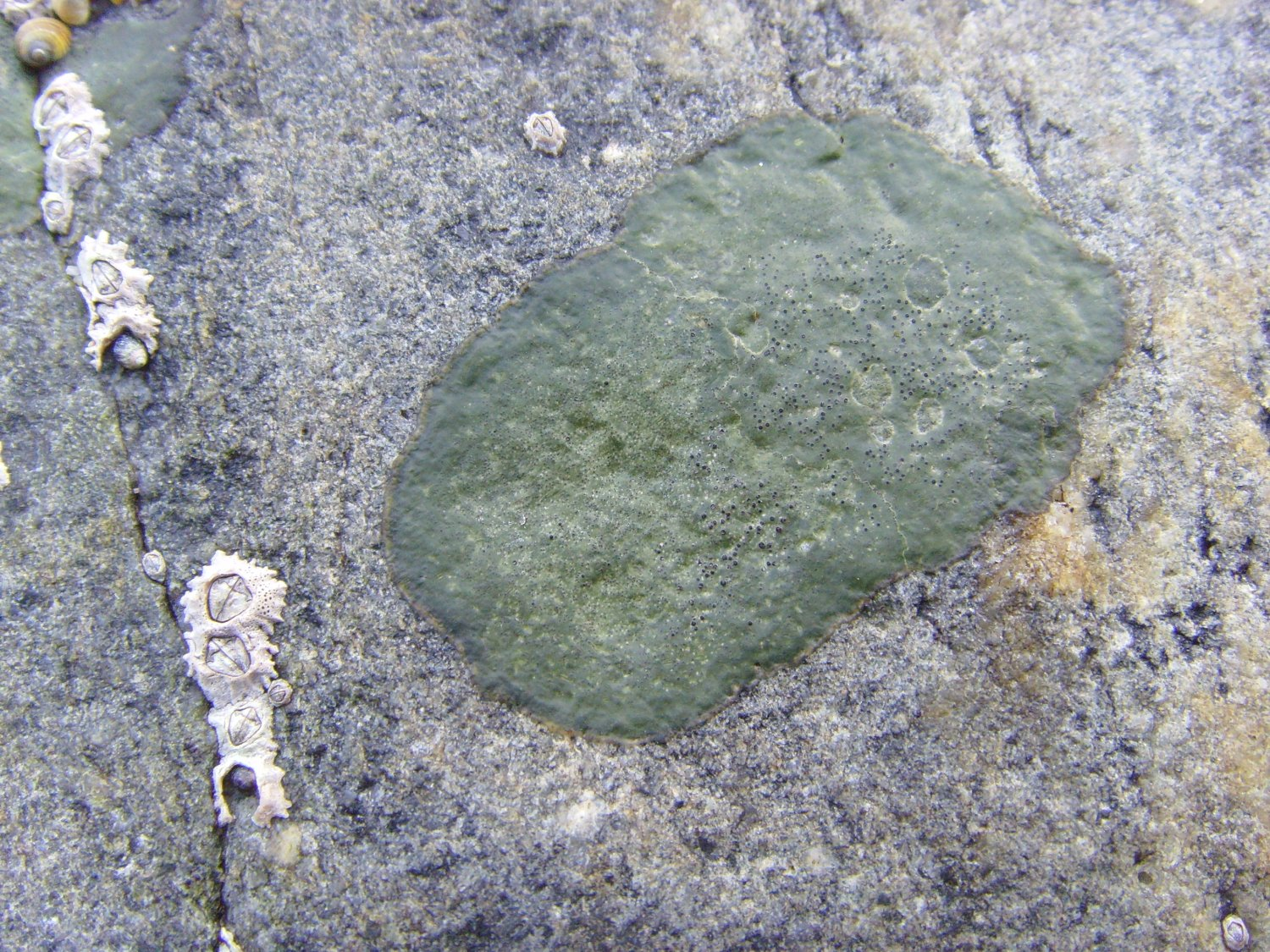

Conservation status
- Apparently Secure (NatureServe)

Scientific classification
- Domain: Eukaryota
- Kingdom: Fungi
- Division: Ascomycota
- Class: Eurotiomycetes
- Order: Verrucariales
- Family: Verrucariaceae
- Genus: Wahlenbergiella
- Species: W. mucosa

Binomial name
- Wahlenbergiella mucosa (Wahlenb. ex Ach.) Gueidan & Thüs (2009)

Synonyms
- Verrucaria mucosa Wahlenb. ex Ach. (1803); Pyrenula maura f. mucosa (Wahlenb. ex Ach.) Flot. (1825); Verrucaria ceuthocarpa * mucosa (Wahlenb. ex Ach.) Nyl. (1861); Verrucaria laetevirens Massee (1892); Thrombium laetevirens A.L.Sm. (1911)

= Wahlenbergiella mucosa =

Species of lichen

Wahlenbergiella mucosa is a species of saxicolous (rock-dwelling), crustose lichen in the family Verrucariaceae. It is a marine species that grows in the littoral zone, and therefore remains immersed in seawater for extended periods. The lichen forms a smooth, shiny thallus up to 1 mm thick that varies in colour from olive-green in shaded areas to dark green or black in full sunlight. First described by Erik Acharius in 1803 as a member of the genus Verrucaria, it was reclassified in 2009 to the genus Wahlenbergiella following molecular phylogenetics research. The species is very common throughout Britain and Ireland (except southeastern England), growing among barnacles and macroalgae, particularly on exposed shores where it forms extensive patches. It has been studied as a potential bioindicator of coastal water pollution.

== Taxonomy ==
The lichen was first formally described by the Swedish lichenologist Erik Acharius as Verrucaria mucosa. The original type specimens were collected by Göran Wahlenberg from northern Europe. Cécile Gueidan and Holger Thüs transferred the taxon to the newly circumscribed Wahlenbergiella in 2009 following molecular phylogenetic-directed revisions of the family Verrucariaceae; it is the type species of that genus.

== Description ==
Wahlenbergiella mucosa is a crustose lichen with a distinctive appearance. Its thallus (main body) is superficial, reaching up to 1 mm in thickness, with a somewhat gelatinous texture. The surface is smooth and shiny, without cracks, and varies in colour depending on light exposure—appearing olive-green in shaded conditions and dark green to black in full sunlight. When fresh and wet, the thallus becomes slightly translucent. A white prothallus (an initial fungal growth stage) is visible around the edges.

Its reproductive structures (perithecia) are immersed within the thallus rather than protruding from it. Each perithecium measures up to 150 micrometres (μm) in diameter and is generally pale in colour except at its apex. The involucrellum, a protective covering, is small and surrounds only the top portion of the perithecium. Inside the perithecia, the lichen produces ascospores (reproductive spores) measuring 7–10 μm in length and 4–7 μm in width. These spores have relatively thick walls compared to those of related species.

The photobiont partner of W. mucosa is the green algal species Paulbroadya petersii.

== Habitat and distribution ==
Wahlenbergiella mucosa inhabits rocky seashores within the mid-littoral zone, growing in both sunny and shaded environments. It commonly grows among barnacles and macroalgae, forming patches that can become quite extensive. The species shows a preference for exposed shores and demonstrates poor tolerance for silty conditions, making it less common in sheltered coastal areas. This lichen is very common throughout Britain and Ireland, with the exception of southeastern England where it appears to be absent.

The species can be confused with the freshwater lichen Verrucaria elaeomelaena, which has a similar appearance. It can also be distinguished from V. ceuthocarpa, which displays a dull brown to nearly black colouration with numerous deep cracks and sometimes more prominent perithecia. V. ceuthocarpa has a much more restricted distribution, known from only two locations in Scotland.

Wahlenbergiella mucosa is one of several marine Verrucariaceae lichens that have been investigated for use as possible bioindicators of coastal water pollution.
