= Wahlenbergiella tavaresiae =

Scientific classification
- Domain: Eukaryota
- Kingdom: Fungi
- Division: Ascomycota
- Class: Eurotiomycetes
- Order: Verrucariales
- Family: Verrucariaceae
- Genus: Wahlenbergiella
- Species: W. tavaresiae

Binomial name
- Wahlenbergiella tavaresiae (R.L.Moe) Gueidan, Thüs & Pérez-Ort. (2011)

Synonyms
- Verrucaria tavaresiae R.L.Moe (1997)

Species of lichen

Wahlenbergiella tavaresiae is a species of saxicolous (rock-dwelling), crustose lichen in the family Verrucariaceae. Known from several locations in the San Francisco Bay area of the United States, it is a marine lichen that inhabits intertidal zones, and as such is immersed in seawater on a regular basis. Associated algal species include the red algae Hildenbrandia and Mastocarpus papillatus, and the brown algae Pelvetiopsis and Fucus. Petroderma maculiforme, a brown alga, is the photobiont partner in the lichen.

== Taxonomy ==
The lichen was first formally described as a new species in 1997 by Richard Moe from specimens collected from Franciscan sandstone at the upper intertidal zone of Fort Mason, San Francisco, California, in 1975. The species epithet honors mycologist and lichenologist Isabelle Tavares of the Herbarium of the University of California at Berkeley, who introduced the author to the study of lichens. In 2011, Cécile Gueidan, Holger Thüs, and Sergio Pérez-Ortega transferred the taxon to the genus Wahlenbergiella, following a molecular phylogenetics-led revision of several genera of the family Verricariaceae.

== Description ==
The lichen, when wet, is dark brownish to greenish black; after exposure to dry air, it becomes initially matte black before lightening. The crust-like thallus measures 0.25–1 mm thick, and adheres tightly to the rock substrate. The photobiont cells are more or less restricted to a distinct layer in the medulla. The frequency of perithecia ranges from sparse to crowded; they are flask-shaped and completely immersed in the thallus, measuring 300–500 μm in diameter. The asci are club-shaped (clavate) and 40 μm long, containing eight spores. Initially spherical, the ascospores become ellipsoid, with dimensions of 12–15 μm by 5–7 μm.
