= Willeya honghensis =

Scientific classification
- Kingdom: Fungi
- Division: Ascomycota
- Class: Eurotiomycetes
- Order: Verrucariales
- Family: Verrucariaceae
- Genus: Willeya
- Species: W. honghensis

Binomial name
- Willeya honghensis (H.Harada & Li S.Wang) Orange (2022)

Synonyms
- Staurothele honghensis H.Harada & Li S.Wang (2006)

Species of lichen

Willeya honghensis is a species of crustose lichen in the family Verrucariaceae. Found in Yunnan, China, it was originally described in 2006 by Hiroshi Harada and Li Wang as a member of the genus Staurothele. Alan Orange reclassified it in Willeya in 2022.
