= Hydropunctaria nipponoamphibia =

Scientific classification
- Kingdom: Fungi
- Division: Ascomycota
- Class: Eurotiomycetes
- Order: Verrucariales
- Family: Verrucariaceae
- Genus: Hydropunctaria
- Species: H. nipponoamphibia

Binomial name
- Hydropunctaria nipponoamphibia H.Harada & K.Hara (2024)

Species of lichen-forming fungus

Hydropunctaria nipponoamphibia is a species of lichen-forming fungus in the family Verrucariaceae. Hydropunctaria nipponoamphibia was described as a new species in 2024 by Hiroshi Harada and Kojiro Hara. The species epithet nipponoamphibia combines nippono-, meaning Japan, with amphibia, meaning "living both in water and on land". The name alludes to the species' resemblance to Hydropunctaria amphibia. The holotype (specimen CBM FL-41444) was collected by Harada and collaborators on 31 August 2019 from seaside rock at Iwadate-tsuka-no-dai, Hachimori, Happou-cho, Yamamoto-gun, Akita Prefecture, Honshu, Japan, at an elevation of 0.5 m.
