= Willeya australis =

Scientific classification
- Kingdom: Fungi
- Division: Ascomycota
- Class: Eurotiomycetes
- Order: Verrucariales
- Family: Verrucariaceae
- Genus: Willeya
- Species: W. australis

Binomial name
- Willeya australis (Groenh.) Gueidan (2014)

Synonyms
- Staurothele australis Groenh. (1954)

Species of lichen

Willeya australis is a species of saxicolous (rock-dwelling), crustose lichen in the family Verrucariaceae. Found in Indonesia, it was formally described as a new species in 1954 by Dutch lichenologist Pieter Groenhart, as Staurothele australis. He found the type specimen growing on rocks in the falls of the Brantas River (Malang, East Java). Although he included it in the genus Staurothele, he suggested that a placement in Willeya might also be appropriate. Cécile Gueidan made that generic transfer official in 2014 following molecular phylogenetic analysis of Staurothele and related genera in the Verrucariaceae.
