= Willeya nepalensis =

Scientific classification
- Kingdom: Fungi
- Division: Ascomycota
- Class: Eurotiomycetes
- Order: Verrucariales
- Family: Verrucariaceae
- Genus: Willeya
- Species: W. nepalensis

Binomial name
- Willeya nepalensis Orange (2022)

Species of lichen

Willeya nepalensis is a species of saxicolous (rock-dwelling) crustose lichen in the family Verrucariaceae. Found in Nepal, it was described by the lichenologist Alan Orange in 2022. Characteristics of this lichen include its cracked thallus and fruiting bodies (perithecia), which are immersed in the thallus.
