= Willeya protrudens =

Scientific classification
- Kingdom: Fungi
- Division: Ascomycota
- Class: Eurotiomycetes
- Order: Verrucariales
- Family: Verrucariaceae
- Genus: Willeya
- Species: W. protrudens

Binomial name
- Willeya protrudens Gueidan (2014)

Species of lichen

Willeya protrudens is a species of saxicolous (rock-dwelling), crustose lichen in the family Verrucariaceae. Found in northern Vietnam, it was formally described as a new species in 2014 by Cécile Gueidan. The type specimen was found growing on calcareous rock outcrops in the Na Hang Nature Reserve (Na Hang district, Tuyên Quang). The species epithet protrudens refers to the projecting perithecia, a morphological feature distinguishing it from other Willeya species.
