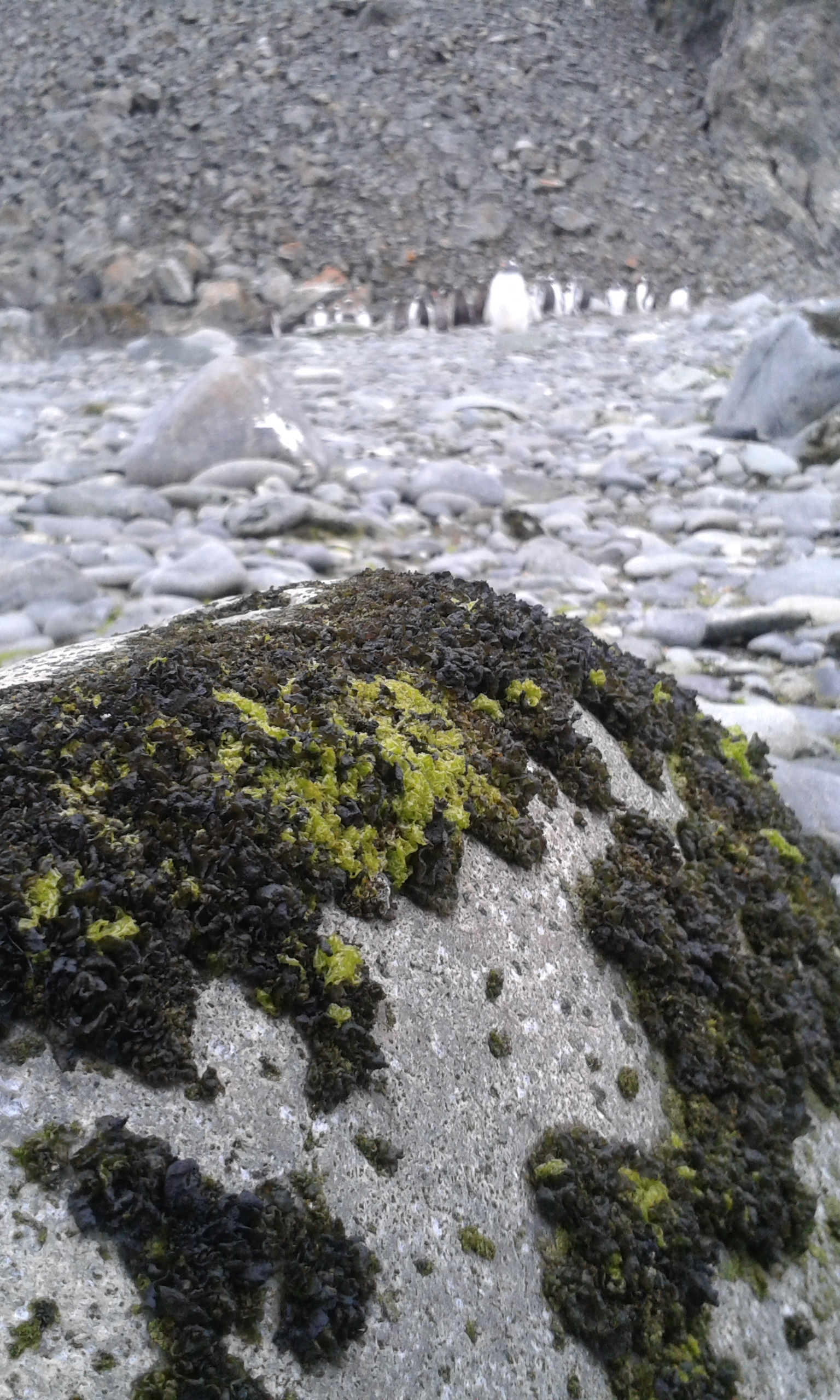
- Mastodia tesselata lichen (dark in color) growing on rocks in an intertidal zone frequented by Gentoo penguins (visible in background)

Scientific classification
- Domain: Eukaryota
- Kingdom: Fungi
- Division: Ascomycota
- Class: Eurotiomycetes
- Order: Verrucariales
- Family: Verrucariaceae
- Genus: Mastodia; Hook.f. & Harv. (1847)

Type species
- Mastodia tessellata (Hook.f. & Harv.) Hook.f. & Harv. (1847)

Species
- M. antarctica M. borealis M. georgica M. mawsonii M. mexicana M. tessellata

Synonyms
- Leptogiopsis Nyl. (1884); Dermatomeris Reinsch (1890); Kohlmeyera S.Schatz (1980)

= Mastodia =

Genus of lichens

Mastodia is a genus of lichen-forming fungi in the family Verrucariaceae. It has six species.

== Taxonomy ==
The genus was circumscribed in 1847 by Joseph Dalton Hooker and William Henry Harvey. The type species, Mastodia tessellata, is a bipolar (i.e., found in both the Arctic and Antarctica), coastal lichen. It forms a symbiotic association with the macroscopic genus Prasiola; this is the only known lichen symbiosis involving a foliose green alga. Studies suggest that throughout its geographic range, the lichen comprises two fungal species (the mycobionts) and three algal lineages (the photobionts) that associate.

Mastodia was once classified in the eponymously named, monogeneric family Mastodiaceae, proposed by Alexander Zahlbruckner in 1908. Over a century later, molecular phylogenetics analysis demonstrated that Mastodia tessellata belongs to the family Verrucariaceae, and has a sister taxon relationship with the marine genus Wahlenbergiella.

== Description ==
Mastodia has a foliose (leaf-like) thallus, which is either umbilicate (attached at a single point like a navel) or stalked, with a somewhat uneven or mixed structure. In Mastodia, the outer layers, or cortices, are not distinctively separated. The medullary hyphae, which are the internal fungal filaments, run perpendicularly between the groups of algae cells. These hyphae stimulate the algal cells to divide into groups of 16 or 32, aiding in the lichen's growth.

The reproductive structures of Mastodia, known as perithecia, are either partially submerged in the thallus or protrude from it. The opening of these structures (ostiole) is centrally located. The surrounding tissue, called the parathecium, varies in colour from transparent to pale brown, but it does not have a carbonaceous (blackened) appearance. The paraphyses, which are filament-like structures within the perithecia, tend to disappear quickly. The asci (spore-producing cells) are either club-shaped or cylindrical and typically contain eight spores. The ascospores are transparent and range from long oval to spindle-shaped, with a single internal compartment.

Mastodia also has pycnidia (asexual fruiting bodies). The supporting structure, or perifulcrum, consists of slender, vertically aligned hyphae. The conidiophores are simple and elongated; the conidia themselves are either oval or rod-shaped. In terms of size, the ascospores of Mastodia measure between 16 and 19 μm in length and 2 to 2.5 μm in width.

== Species ==
- Mastodia antarctica (Kütz.) C.W.Dodge (1948)
- Mastodia borealis (M.Reed) C.W.Dodge (1948)
- Mastodia georgica (Reinsch) C.W.Dodge (1948)
- Mastodia mawsonii C.W.Dodge (1948)
- Mastodia mexicana (J.Agardh) C.W.Dodge (1948)
- Mastodia tessellata (Hook.f. & Harv.) Hook.f. & Harv. (1847)

Both Mastodia complicatula (Nyl.) C.W.Dodge (1948), and Mastodia macquariensis C.W.Dodge (1970) are synonyms of Mastodia tessellata.
