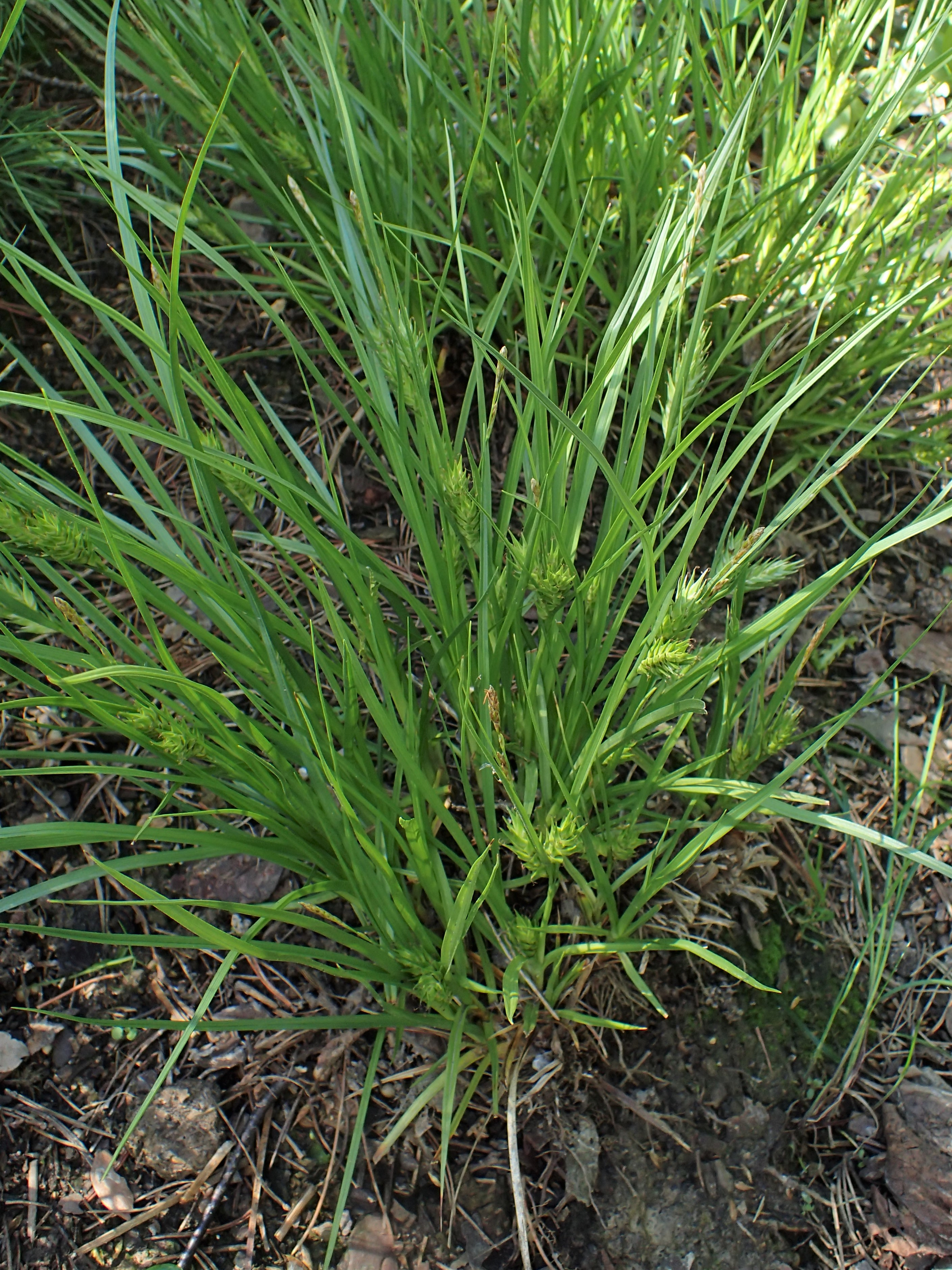
- Habit
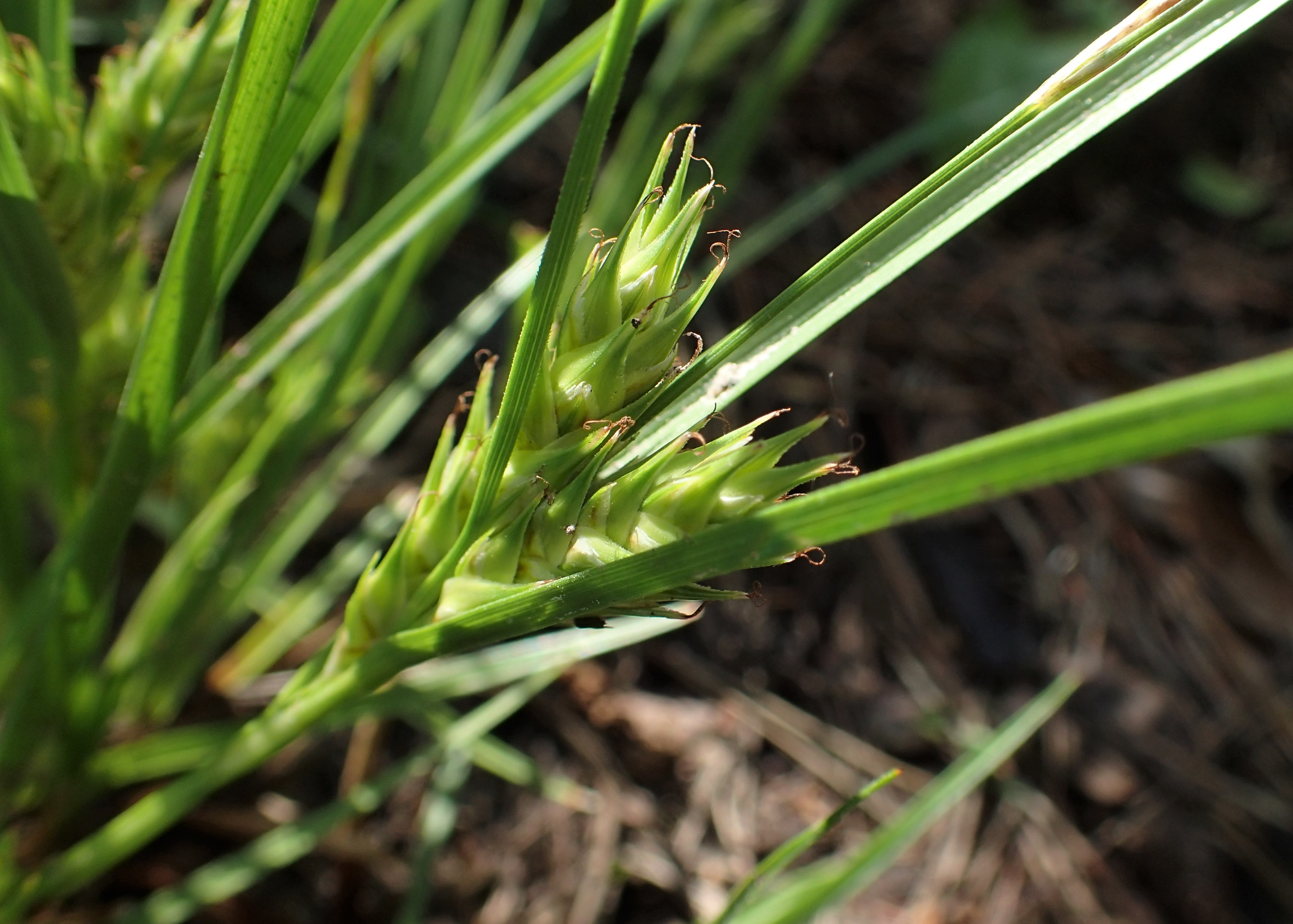
- Close-up of spikes

Scientific classification
- Kingdom: Plantae
- Clade: Tracheophytes
- Clade: Angiosperms
- Clade: Monocots
- Clade: Commelinids
- Order: Poales
- Family: Cyperaceae
- Genus: Carex
- Species: C. secalina

Binomial name
- Carex secalina Willd. ex Wahlenb.

Synonyms
- Carex hordeistichos var. microcarpa Boeckeler; Carex hordeistichos var. microstachys Schur; Carex hordeistichos var. secalina (Willd. ex Wahlenb.) Boott; Kuekenthalia secalina (Willd. ex Wahlenb.) Fedde & J.Schust.

= Carex secalina =

Species of plant

Carex secalina, the rye sedge, is a species of flowering plant in the family Cyperaceae. It is native to central and eastern Europe, the Caucasus, Iran, Kazakhstan, and on to Siberia, and it has been introduced to the Russian Far East, Belgium, and New York State. It is usually found growing in saline, wet meadows, and so is pre-adapted to grow in ditches next to roads that are heavily salted in winter.

== Subtaxa ==
The following varieties are accepted:

- Carex secalina var. alpina Kük. & Bornm. – Iran
- Carex secalina var. secalina – entire range
