= Willeya fusca =

Scientific classification
- Kingdom: Fungi
- Division: Ascomycota
- Class: Eurotiomycetes
- Order: Verrucariales
- Family: Verrucariaceae
- Genus: Willeya
- Species: W. fusca

Binomial name
- Willeya fusca Gueidan (2014)

Species of lichen

Willeya fusca is a species of saxicolous (rock-dwelling), crustose lichen in the family Verrucariaceae. Found in Vietnam, it was formally described as a new species in 2014 by Cécile Gueidan. The species epithet fusca refers to its characteristic dark brown areolate thallus, a feature that distinguishes it from other Willeya species.
