= Willeya laevigata =

Scientific classification
- Kingdom: Fungi
- Division: Ascomycota
- Class: Eurotiomycetes
- Order: Verrucariales
- Family: Verrucariaceae
- Genus: Willeya
- Species: W. laevigata

Binomial name
- Willeya laevigata Gueidan (2014)

Species of lichen

Willeya laevigata is a species of saxicolous (rock-dwelling), crustose lichen in the family Verrucariaceae. Found in northwest Vietnam, it was formally described as a new species in 2014 by Cécile Gueidan. The type specimen was found growing on shaded calcareous rock outcrops in a rainforest in the Mai Châu district of Hòa Bình province. The species epithet laevigata refers to the smooth upper surface of the thallus.
