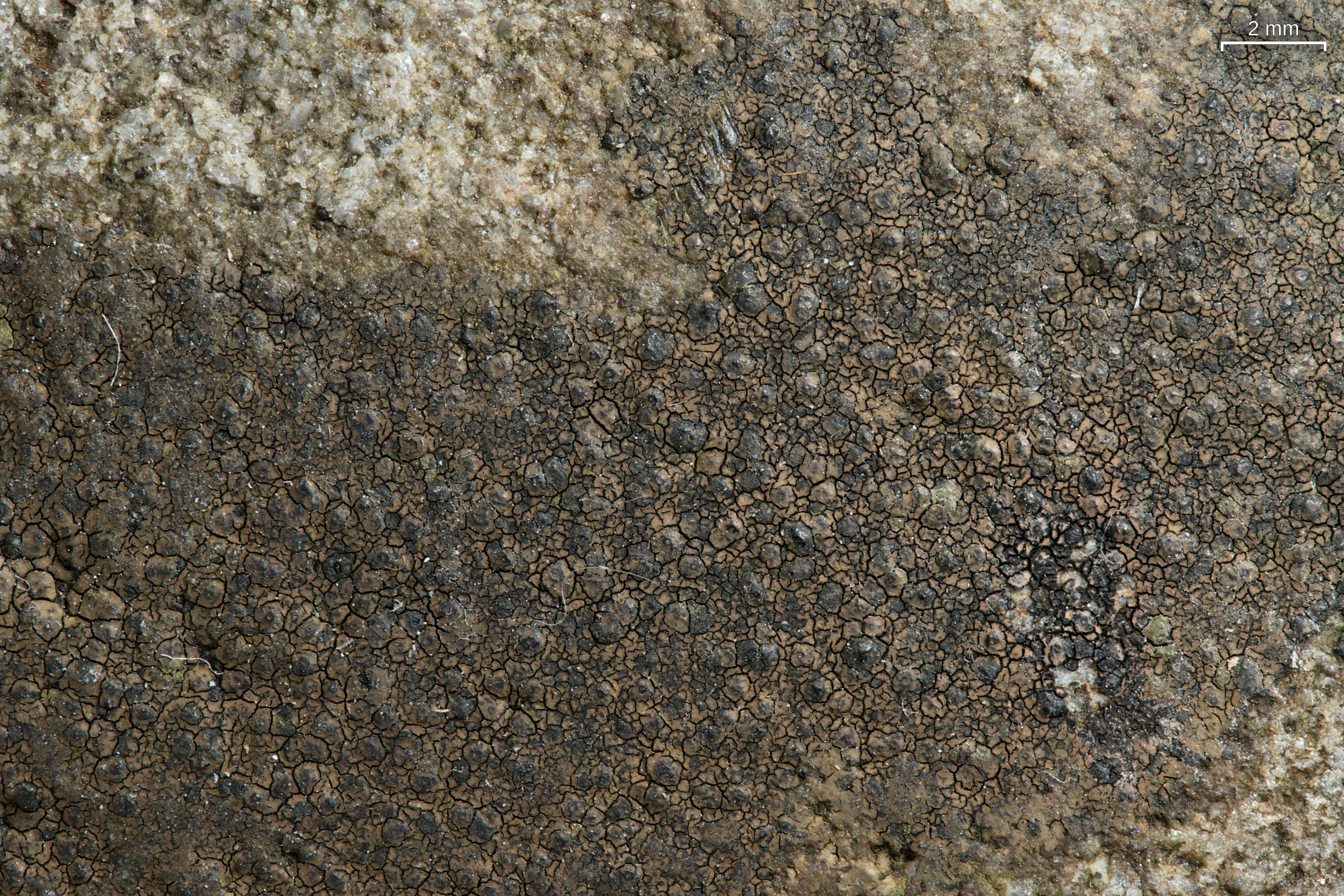
- Willeya diffractella

Scientific classification
- Kingdom: Fungi
- Division: Ascomycota
- Class: Eurotiomycetes
- Order: Verrucariales
- Family: Verrucariaceae
- Genus: Willeya; Müll.Arg. (1883)

Type species
- Willeya diffractella (Nyl.) Müll.Arg. (1883)

= Willeya =

Genus of lichens

Willeya is a genus of saxicolous (rock-dwelling), crustose lichens in the family Verrucariaceae. It has 12 species. Most species are found in southeast Asia, although individual representatives are known from Australia, Europe, and North America.

== Taxonomy ==
Willeya was originally proposed by Swiss lichenologist Johannes Müller Argoviensis in 1883 to contain Staurothele species with pale ascospores, and based on Willeya diffractella as the type species. The genus was later resurrected for use after molecular data showed that species of Staurothele from Vietnam belong to an unnamed clade that has a sister group relationship to the genus Endocarpon. These species, in addition to the tropical Australian species Staurothele pallidopora and the North American species Staurothele diffractella, were included in the new phylogenetically defined circumscription of Willeya (three new species and eight new combinations). The first European species, Willeya tetraspora, was added to the genus in 2016. This lichen, found in a botanical garden in the Netherlands, was growing on limestone that was imported from China.

== Description ==
Willeya lichens have a crust-like thallus with a pseudocortex (a boundary layer in the thallus where the hyphae, although distinct, are not organized into a tissue with a regular cellular or fibrous structure). Their perithecia have algae cells in the hymenium, a feature shared with only a few Verrucariaceae genera (Endocarpon is another). These algae, the photobionts, are stichococcoid algae from the green-algal genus Diplosphaera.

== Species ==
- Willeya australis (Groenh.) Gueidan (2014) – Indonesia
- Willeya diffractella (Nyl.) Müll.Arg. (1883) – North America
- Willeya fusca Gueidan (2014) – Vietnam
- Willeya eminens Orange (2022) – Nepal
- Willeya honghensis (H.Harada & Li S.Wang) Orange (2022) – China; Nepal
- Willeya irrigata Orange (2022) – Nepal
- Willeya iwatsukii (H.Harada) Gueidan (2014) – Japan
- Willeya japonica (B.de Lesd.) Gueidan (2014) – Japan
- Willeya laevigata Gueidan (2014) – Vietnam
- Willeya malayensis (Zahlbr.) Gueidan (2014) – Indonesia
- Willeya microlepis (Zahlbr.) Gueidan (2014) – China
- Willeya nepalensis Orange (2022) – Nepal
- Willeya pallidipora (P.M.McCarthy) Gueidan (2014) – Australia; Vietnam
- Willeya protrudens Gueidan (2014) – Vietnam
- Willeya rimosa Müll.Arg. (1889) – Vietnam
- Willeya tetraspora Aptroot (2016) – Europe
