= Willeya iwatsukii =

Scientific classification
- Kingdom: Fungi
- Division: Ascomycota
- Class: Eurotiomycetes
- Order: Verrucariales
- Family: Verrucariaceae
- Genus: Willeya
- Species: W. iwatsukii

Binomial name
- Willeya iwatsukii (H.Harada) Gueidan (2014)

Synonyms
- Staurothele iwatsukii H.Harada (1992)

Species of lichen

Willeya iwatsukii is a species of saxicolous (rock-dwelling) crustose lichen in the family Verrucariaceae.

== Taxonomy ==
The lichen was first described as a new species by the Japanese lichenologist Hiroshi Harada in 1992, who classified it in the genus Staurothele. The type specimen was collected from Shikoku, Japan, where it was found growing on a rock at the edge of a stream. Cécile Gueidan transferred the taxon to the genus Willeya in 2014.
