= Jannaschia seosinensis =

Scientific classification
- Domain: Bacteria
- Kingdom: Pseudomonadati
- Phylum: Pseudomonadota
- Class: Alphaproteobacteria
- Order: Rhodobacterales
- Family: Rhodobacteraceae
- Genus: Jannaschia
- Species: J. seosinensis

Binomial name
- Jannaschia seosinensis Choi et al. 2006

Type strain
- JCM 13035, KCCM 42114, CL-SP26

Species of bacterium

Jannaschia seosinensis is a slightly halophilic bacterium from the genus of Jannaschia which has been isolated from hypersaline water from a solar saltern from Seosin in Korea.
