= Hydropunctaria symbalana =

Scientific classification
- Domain: Eukaryota
- Kingdom: Fungi
- Division: Ascomycota
- Class: Eurotiomycetes
- Order: Verrucariales
- Family: Verrucariaceae
- Genus: Hydropunctaria
- Species: H. symbalana

Binomial name
- Hydropunctaria symbalana (Nyl.) Cl.Roux (2020)

Synonyms
- Verrucaria symbalana Nyl. (1873); Verrucaria maura var. symbalana (Nyl.) Wedd. (1875)

Species of lichen

Hydropunctaria symbalana is a species of saxicolous (rock-dwelling), crustose lichen in the family Verrucariaceae. This Mediterranean marine lichen was first described as a new species in 1873 by the Finish lichenologist William Nylander, who classified it in the genus Verrucaria. The type specimen was collected in Cape Béar, in the Eastern Pyrenees region of France, near the Mediterranean Sea. Claude Roux transferred the taxon to the genus Hydropunctaria in 2020.

In addition to France, the lichen has been documented from marine communities in Greece, and in Turkey's Iskenderun Bay, where it lives in the littoral zone in maritime environments.

== Description ==
Hydropunctaria symbalana is a crustose lichen that grows on the surface of its substrate (episubstratic). It displays a dark olive-brown to olive-black colouration and becomes somewhat gelatinous when wet. The thallus (main body of the lichen) appears continuous or cracked (rimose), with a surface that is either smooth or, more commonly, covered with slightly raised, punctiform (dot-like) black warts or short ridges.

The cortex (outer protective layer) of the thallus is barely differentiated and contains a brown pigment that shows no reaction when treated with potassium hydroxide solution (K-). The photobiont cells (the algal partner in the lichen symbiosis) are arranged in vertical rows throughout the thallus. The medulla (inner layer) features distinctive pillars of dark brown to black tissue that often extend to the thallus surface.

The reproductive structures of H. symbalana are perithecia, which appear as black, largely immersed bodies within thalline warts measuring up to 0.45 mm wide. These perithecia project from the surface with a characteristic crater-like ostiolar region (opening). Each perithecium has a thick involucrellum (protective covering) that extends to the base-level, and a black, roughly spherical exciple (inner wall) measuring 0.16–0.22 mm across. The hamathecium (sterile tissue among the asci) consists of periphyses and periphysoids, with interascal filaments absent. The hymenial gel (the matrix in which the asci develop) stains blue when treated with iodine (I+ blue), indicating an amyloid reaction.

The asci (spore-producing structures) are eight-spored and club-shaped (clavate) in form. They do not react with iodine (I-) and are fissitunicate, meaning they have a specialised double-wall structure that aids in spore discharge. The wall is thickened above, featuring an ocular chamber, and dehisces by extruding an endotunica to form a delicate rostrum – a characteristic known as the Verrucaria-type. The ascospores are single-celled, hyaline (colourless and transparent), oblong-ellipsoid in shape, and measure 12–16 by 6–8 μm. The pycnidia (asexual reproductive structures) are immersed in the thallus with colourless walls and ostioles, producing bacilliform (rod-shaped) conidia. The photobiont (algal partner) is chlorococcoid. Standard lichen spot tests show no reactions (K−, C−, KC−, P−, UV−), indicating the absence of secondary metabolites in its chemistry.
