= Jannaschia donghaensis =

Scientific classification
- Domain: Bacteria
- Kingdom: Pseudomonadati
- Phylum: Pseudomonadota
- Class: Alphaproteobacteria
- Order: Rhodobacterales
- Family: Rhodobacteraceae
- Genus: Jannaschia
- Species: J. donghaensis

Binomial name
- Jannaschia donghaensis Yoon et al. 2007

Type strain
- JCM 14563, KCTC 12862, strain DSW-17

Species of bacterium

Jannaschia donghaensis is a Gram-negative and non-motile bacterium from the genus of Jannaschia which has been isolated from seawater from the Sea of Japan from the Liancourt Rocks.
