= Jannaschia confluentis =

Scientific classification
- Domain: Bacteria
- Kingdom: Pseudomonadati
- Phylum: Pseudomonadota
- Class: Alphaproteobacteria
- Order: Rhodobacterales
- Family: Rhodobacteraceae
- Genus: Jannaschia
- Species: J. confluentis

Binomial name
- Jannaschia confluentis Park et al. 2018

Type strain
- JSSK-16, KACC 19436, KCTC 62137, NBRC 113018

Species of bacterium

Jannaschia confluentis is a Gram-negative, aerobic, and non-motile bacterium from the genus of Jannaschia which has been isolated from the Jeju Island in Korea.
