= Hydropunctaria alaskana =

Scientific classification
- Domain: Eukaryota
- Kingdom: Fungi
- Division: Ascomycota
- Class: Eurotiomycetes
- Order: Verrucariales
- Family: Verrucariaceae
- Genus: Hydropunctaria
- Species: H. alaskana

Binomial name
- Hydropunctaria alaskana Thüs & Pérez-Ort. (2020)

Species of lichen

Hydropunctaria alaskana is a species of crustose lichen in the family Verrucariaceae. The lichen forms a dark, cracked crust on rocks near the sea that occasionally become submerged by water. The species is distinguished by its small, dome-shaped fruiting bodies that protrude from the dark crust and produce microscopic spores inside flask-shaped structures. It was discovered in 2020 in Alaska's Glacier Bay National Park and Preserve and is also found on islands in Alaska and British Columbia.

== Taxonomy ==
The lichen was described as a new species in 2020 by Holger Thüs and Sergio Pérez-Ortega. The type specimen was collected from the Hoonah-Angoon Census Area in Glacier Bay National Park and Preserve, where it was found growing on metamorphic rocks beside a creek. Buellia coniops and Verrucaria aethiobola were other lichens on the same rock.

== Description ==
Hydropunctaria alaskana forms a dark, rock-hugging crust. The thallus lies mostly on top of the substrate (episubstratal) and is riddled with cracks that break it into tiny, angular areoles. Sterile patches are only about 40–115 micrometers (μm) thick, while the fertile areoles that carry the fruit bodies expand to 400–600 μm across, roughly two to three times wider than the barren ones. The surface is brown-black—sometimes tinged rusty red where airborne mineral grains settle—and it stays dull and opaque when wet, lacking the jelly-like sheen seen in some relatives. A delicate outer skin (pseudocortex) is either absent or just 5–8 μm high, and a pale, occasionally fringed prothallus may outline the colony. The photosynthetic partner is a single-celled green alga whose cuboid cells measure about 7–8 μm long and 6–7 μm wide. Within the thallus, a deep "black basal layer" of pigmented tissue gives rise to frequent, pin-head-sized black shafts (jugae) that pierce the upper layers, especially near the fruit-bodies and along the thallus edge.

The sexual structures are perithecia—low, flattened domes that stand 1.5–4 times higher than the surrounding crust and may be densely crowded or dot the thallus more sparsely. Each perithecium is sheathed by a conical involucrellum that fuses laterally with the black basal layer, and the main wall (exciple) is uniformly pigmented dark brown to black. Microscopic examination shows slender periphyses (22–35 × 1–2 μm) lining the neck; the soft interascal filaments soon dissolve into a jelly that stains red in iodine and deep blue after potassium iodide treatment—a reaction used by lichenologists to confirm the genus. The flask-shaped asci, eight to a sac, are 30–51 × 14–16 μm. They release smooth, colorless ascospores 10.8–17.9 μm long and 4.7–9.2 μm wide (length/width ratio usually 1.8–2.4); unlike many freshwater Hydropunctaria species, the spores lack the clear, gelatinous envelope (halo) that often surrounds them.

No lichen products were detected in Hydropunctaria alaskana using thin-layer chromatography, and the brown pigments that color both the pseudocortex and the basal layer remain unchanged in potassium hydroxide (KOH-). In the field, the combination of a cracked, wholly dark thallus with black protruding jugae, low domed perithecia, and the diagnostic iodine reaction provides a reliable set of characters for recognising H. alaskana on coastal or alpine rock faces.

== Habitat and distribution ==
Originally described from specimens collected in Alaska, Hydropunctaria alaskana is also known to occur on Mitkof Island in Alaska, and on Vancouver Island in British Columbia. It grows on siliceous rocks near the sea that occasionally get submerged.
