= Jannaschia rubra =

Scientific classification
- Domain: Bacteria
- Kingdom: Pseudomonadati
- Phylum: Pseudomonadota
- Class: Alphaproteobacteria
- Order: Rhodobacterales
- Family: Rhodobacteraceae
- Genus: Jannaschia
- Species: J. rubra

Binomial name
- Jannaschia rubra Macián et al. 2005

Type strain
- CECT 5088, DSM 16279, strain 4SM3

Species of bacterium

Jannaschia rubra is a Gram-negative, strictly aerobic, and slightly halophilic bacterium from the genus of Jannaschia which has been isolated from sea water near Valencia in Spain.
