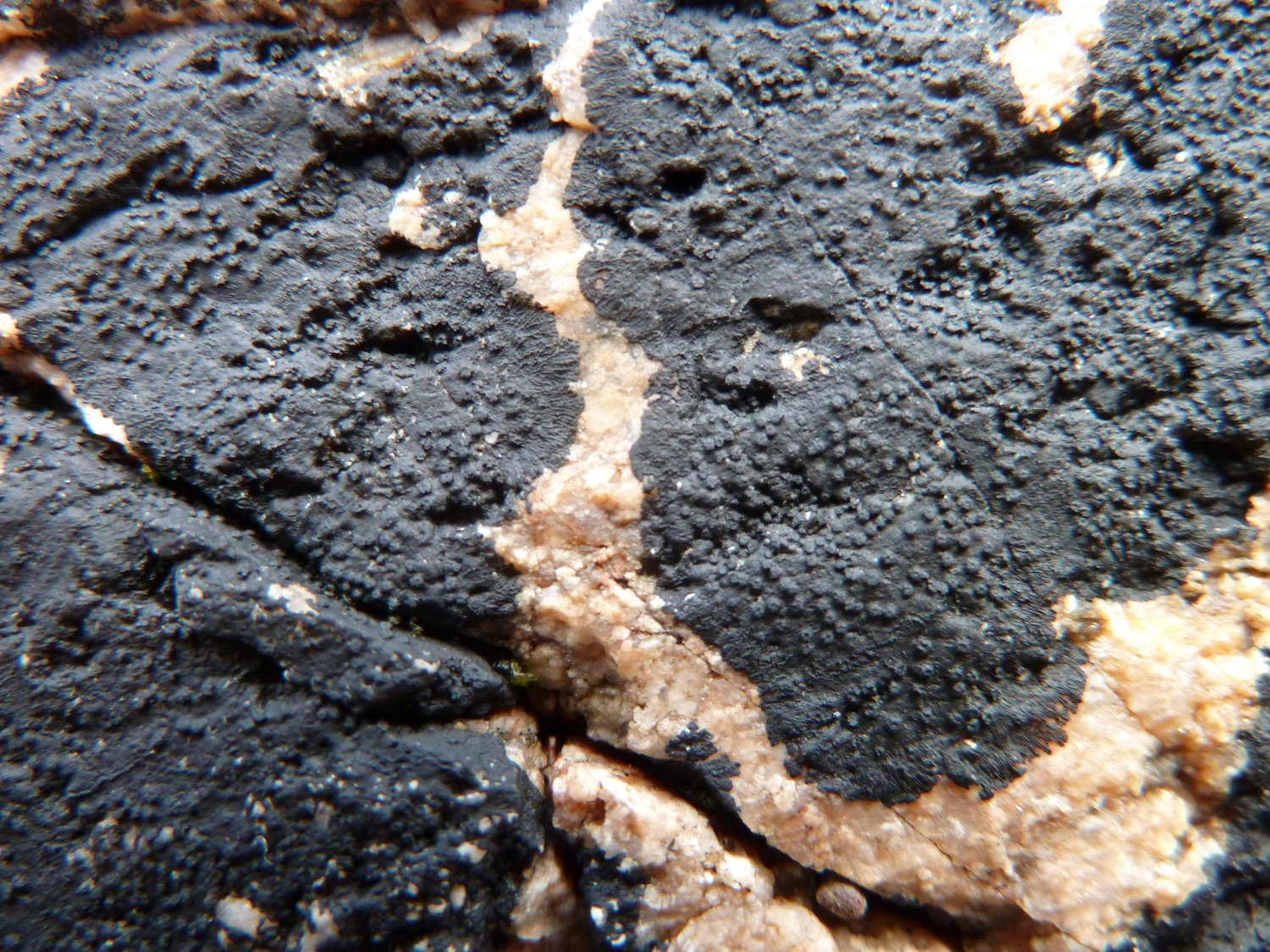

Scientific classification
- Kingdom: Fungi
- Division: Ascomycota
- Class: Eurotiomycetes
- Order: Verrucariales
- Family: Verrucariaceae
- Genus: Hydropunctaria
- Species: H. amphibia

Binomial name
- Hydropunctaria amphibia (Clemente) Cl.Roux (2011)

Synonyms
- Verrucaria amphibia Clemente (1807)

= Hydropunctaria amphibia =

Species of lichen

Hydropunctaria amphibia is a species of saxicolous (rock-dwelling), crustose lichen in the family Verrucariaceae. One of several marine lichens in the genus Hydropunctaria, is widely distributed across Europe, extending from Norway to the Mediterranean and the Iberian coasts, and has a nearly ubiquitous presence along the Catalan coast of Spain. In North America, it is found along the Atlantic Coast from Nova Scotia to the Boston Harbor islands, where its presence in low-pollution areas indicates its potential as a bioindicator for marine lichen community health, and on the west coast in British Columbia, particularly in the Gwaii Haanas's upper littoral fringe. The black, crust-like thallus grows on seashore rocks – both siliceous rocks and limestone – in the lower supralittoral zone, an area also known as the splash zone. Originally described more than two centuries ago as a species of Verrucaria, Hydropunctaria amphibia sets itself apart from other species in Hydropunctaria through the distinct shape of the perithecium (fruiting body) apex, which is either flat-topped or scalloped, in contrast to the typically rounded or immersed apex seen in its relatives.

== Taxonomy ==
The lichen was originally described in 1807 by the Spanish botanist Simón de Roxas Clemente y Rubio, who classified it as a species of Verrucaria. His Latin description of the species was Crusta subtartarea suborbiculari uniformi contigua aequabili picea nitida, tuberculis subcylindricis tandem subpatellulaeformibus ('The crust is almost tartarean, suborbicular, uniform, contiguous, even, pitch-black, shiny, with tubercles initially subcylindrical then eventually somewhat in the form of a small patella (kneecap)'). (Note: Passage translated by GPT-4.) In 2011, Claude Roux reclassified the taxon to Hydropunctaria, a genus previously branched out from Verrucaria in 2009 to form its own distinct group. Alan Orange, apparently unaware of this transfer, proposed a similar transfer himself the following year.

== Description ==
The crustose lichen Hydropunctaria amphibia is characterised by a prothallus that is typically inconspicuous, but in some specific, small areas, it can become visible as a whitish layer. The thallus, which is on the surface of the rock, presents a translucent green to amber colouration when wet, and black when dry. It has an abundantly cracked surface that often separates into discrete areoles (small, distinct patches), making the surface appear uneven with numerous blackish ridges. The actively growing edge of the thallus is clearly defined, with ridges measuring between 40 and 400 micrometres (μm) in length and 40 to 50 μm in width, generally aligned perpendicular to the margin. Within the interior of the thallus, these ridges are shorter, often branched, and do not follow a uniform direction.

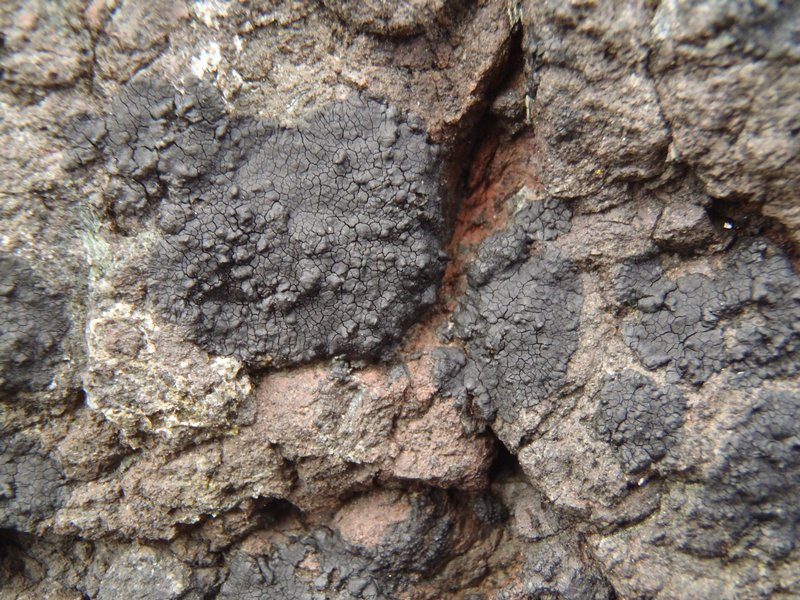
Hydropunctaria amphibia growing on aerohaline (sea-sprayed) rocks.

The pseudocortex, a layer beneath the surface of the thallus, contains brown pigment, contributing to the lichen's dark appearance. Perithecia, the reproductive structures of the lichen, project from the thallus surface. They typically measure 220 to 360 μm in diameter, and often have a distinct flat top. The sides may be uneven or have protrusions (bosses). The ostiole, or opening, of the perithecia may be visible as a small pit.

The involucrellum, another structural component of the perithecia, is well-developed, providing additional protection to the spore-producing parts. The ascospores, which are the reproductive cells produced within the perithecia, are narrowly cylindrical to ellipsoidal in shape, measuring between 13 and 19.5 μm in length and 5 to 7.5 μm in width, with a length to width ratio ranging from 2.1 to 3.5, indicating their elongated form.

The photobiont of H. amphibia specimens collected in the Iberian Peninsula was Halofilum ramosum (a species of green alga in the order Ulvales). In an ecological study conducted in Anglesey, off the north-west coast of Wales, H. amphibia was shown to have a distribution similar to the brown algal species Pelvetia canaliculata, and species of the red algal genus Hildenbrandia.

== Similar species ==
Hydropunctaria amphibia can be distinguished from other species within the genus Hydropunctaria by several characteristics. One of the key differences is the structure of the perithecium, which in Hydropunctaria amphibia is either flat-topped or crenulate (having a scalloped or notched edge), as opposed to the more commonly rounded or immersed apex found in other Hydropunctaria species. Furthermore, Hydropunctaria amphibia has a more extensive development of densely pigmented tissue throughout its thallus. This pigmentation manifests as elongated bars, up to 60 μm wide, that reach the surface of the thallus. These pigmented areas are particularly noticeable near the thallus margin, where they align perpendicularly to the margin and parallel to the elongated cracks that characterise the species.

One study suggested that a feasible way to distinguish between H. amphibia and H. maura was the thickness of the thallus edge and the width of the ascospores. A later publication, however, found that these characters overlapped in the studied population, and that it was more reliable to use the shape of the perithecia, the extent of thallus cover over the perithecia, and the shape of the carbonaceous thickenings. Another source suggests that when wet, H. amphibia becomes more light coloured and translucent compared to H. maura, and so its ridges become more distinctly contrasted.

In comparison, Wahlenbergiella striatula, another marine lichen species that may present ridges on its thallus, differs primarily in the size of its ascospores, which are smaller than those of Hydropunctaria amphibia. Also, its thallus has a dot matrix that imparts texture to the surface.

== Habitat and distribution ==
Hydropunctaria amphibia is one of several marine lichens in the genus Hydropunctaria. It grows on seashore rocks, both siliceous and limestone. Rarely, it has been recorded growing on concrete. It usually grows in the supralittoral zone, the area above the spring high tide line that is regularly but infrequently splashed. It typically gets exposure to direct sunlight in these locations. It is one of few species able to survive under these conditions, due to its extreme resistance to desiccation. Other organisms commonly found in this habitat include the barnacle species Microeuraphia depressa, and the sea snail species Melarhaphe neritoides and Echinolittorina punctata. Hydropunctaria amphibia grows in the belt underneath its close relative H. maura.

The lichen is widely distributed in Europe, from Norway south to the Mediterranean and also on the Iberian coasts. Detailed cartography of the littoral habitats found along the Catalan coast of Spain show its almost ubiquitous presence there. In North America, Hydropunctaria amphibia has been documented from the Atlantic Coast, including the littoral zone of Nova Scotia's Bay of Fundy coast, the coast of Newfoundland and Labrador, and the Boston Harbor Islands National Recreation Area. In the latter location, it only grows in low-pollution areas, suggesting low pollution tolerance, and potential for use as a bioindicator of marine lichen community health. On the west coast, it is known to occur in British Columbia. In the Gwaii Hanaas, it grows in the upper littoral fringe (defined as 0.3–0.8 m (1 ft 0 in – 2 ft 7 in) above the Fucus barnacle zone), most commonly on limestone.
