= Willeya tetraspora =

Scientific classification
- Kingdom: Fungi
- Division: Ascomycota
- Class: Eurotiomycetes
- Order: Verrucariales
- Family: Verrucariaceae
- Genus: Willeya
- Species: W. tetraspora

Binomial name
- Willeya tetraspora Aptroot (2016)

Species of lichen

Willeya tetraspora is a species of saxicolous (rock-dwelling) lichen in the family Verrucariaceae. It was discovered in 2016 growing on limestone rocks that had been imported from China to a botanical garden in the Netherlands. The species is unusual among its relatives because it produces only four ascospores per spore-containing structure, while other members of the genus typically produce eight. This lichen forms pale brown crusty patches that crack into small angular pieces on rock surfaces.

== Taxonomy ==
Willeya tetraspora was described by André Aptroot in 2016 from material discovered on ornamental limestone in the Chinese garden of the Hortus Haren, the Netherlands. The limestone boulders had been imported from a karst region of China, and the species is presumed to be native to China rather than Europe; its occurrence in the Netherlands represents the first record of Willeya on the continent. Aptroot designated a holotype from Haren.

The genus Willeya was resurrected in 2014 to segregate species formerly placed in Staurothele, based on a distinct clade and a set of characters including a crustose thallus with a pseudocortex, the presence of algae in the hymenium, and muriform ascospores that remain hyaline to pale brown (in contrast to Staurothele, where mature spores become dark brown). W. tetraspora is distinctive within Willeya because its asci contain four spores (hence the species epithet), whereas other accepted species in the genus have eight (rarely 6–8). Aptroot noted that superficially similar taxa either differ in ecology (e.g., aquatic species) or in spore size and pigmentation; the combination of characters in W. tetraspora did not match any described species.

== Description ==
The thallus forms a dull, pale-brown crust (crustose) on the rock surface, about 0.2–0.5 mm thick, which cracks into angular plates (areoles) roughly 0.4–0.8 mm across. The surface is capped by a pseudocortex—an outer tissue made of tightly packed fungal cells (paraplectenchyma)—with the algae concentrated in a layer just beneath it. The sexual reproductive structures are perithecia (flask-shaped fruiting bodies) mostly immersed in the thallus, appearing as small, black, hemispherical domes 0.2–0.3 mm in diameter with a pale, depressed pore (ostiole); a thin, laterally spreading involucrellum covers the upper wall. The pore is lined with numerous, persistent periphyses (hair-like sterile filaments), and the hymenium contains abundant, spherical algae. The hamathecium (tissue between the spore sacs) is evanescent—breaking down as the perithecium matures.

Asci are clavate and bear four muriform ascospores—spores divided by multiple cross walls into a brick-like pattern—each ellipsoid and typically 30–35 × 12–14 μm. Asexual structures include numerous superficial pycnidia (tiny pale-brown dots), although conidia were not observed. In standard spot tests, the thallus is K−, C− and UV−. The hymenium reacts I+ red-brown (dextrinoid) with iodine, a chemical test used by lichenologists to characterise tissues.

== Habitat and distribution ==
The species was found growing on naturally shaped limestone boulders in a botanical garden, where the stones had been placed in their original orientation. The surrounding lichen community on the exposed, dry limestone was sparse, dominated by widely distributed calcicolous crusts. W. tetraspora itself formed patches up to several centimetres across on the epilithic surface (on top of the rock).

Although recorded in Europe, the species is very likely an introduction with the imported stone; its natural range is presumed to be in China and has yet to be documented in the wild. On the same boulders, Aptroot reported species such as Verrucaria nigrescens, Bagliettoa calciseda, Catillaria lenticularis, Flavoplaca dichroa, Protoblastenia rupestris, Variospora flavescens and Verrucaria foveolata; some of these may also have arrived with the rock, as suggested by the presence of large, older thalli. No other European occurrence of Willeya was known at the time of description.
