= Jannaschia seohaensis =

Scientific classification
- Domain: Bacteria
- Kingdom: Pseudomonadati
- Phylum: Pseudomonadota
- Class: Alphaproteobacteria
- Order: Rhodobacterales
- Family: Rhodobacteraceae
- Genus: Jannaschia
- Species: J. seohaensis

Binomial name
- Jannaschia seohaensis Yoon et al. 2010

Type strain
- CCUG 55326, DSM 25227, DSM 25227, strain SMK-146

Species of bacterium

Jannaschia seohaensis is a Gram-negative and motile bacterium from the genus of Jannaschia which has been isolated from tidal flat sediments from the Yellow Sea in Korea.
