= Jannaschia helgolandensis =

Scientific classification
- Domain: Bacteria
- Kingdom: Pseudomonadati
- Phylum: Pseudomonadota
- Class: Alphaproteobacteria
- Order: Rhodobacterales
- Family: Rhodobacteraceae
- Genus: Jannaschia
- Species: J. helgolandensis

Binomial name
- Jannaschia helgolandensis Wagner-Döbler et al. 2003

Type strain
- DSM 14858, NCIMB 13941, strain Hel 10

Species of bacterium

Jannaschia helgolandensis is a heterotrophic bacterium from the genus of Jannaschia which has been isolated from seawater from the North Sea at Helgoland in Germany.
