= Jannaschia aquimarina =

Scientific classification
- Domain: Bacteria
- Kingdom: Pseudomonadati
- Phylum: Pseudomonadota
- Class: Alphaproteobacteria
- Order: Rhodobacterales
- Family: Rhodobacteraceae
- Genus: Jannaschia
- Species: J. aquimarina

Binomial name
- Jannaschia aquimarina Park and Yoon 2012

Type strain
- CCUG 60899, KCTC 23555, strain GSW-M26

Species of bacterium

Jannaschia aquimarina is a Gram-negative, aerobic, and non-motile bacterium from the genus of Jannaschia which has been isolated from seawater from Korea.
