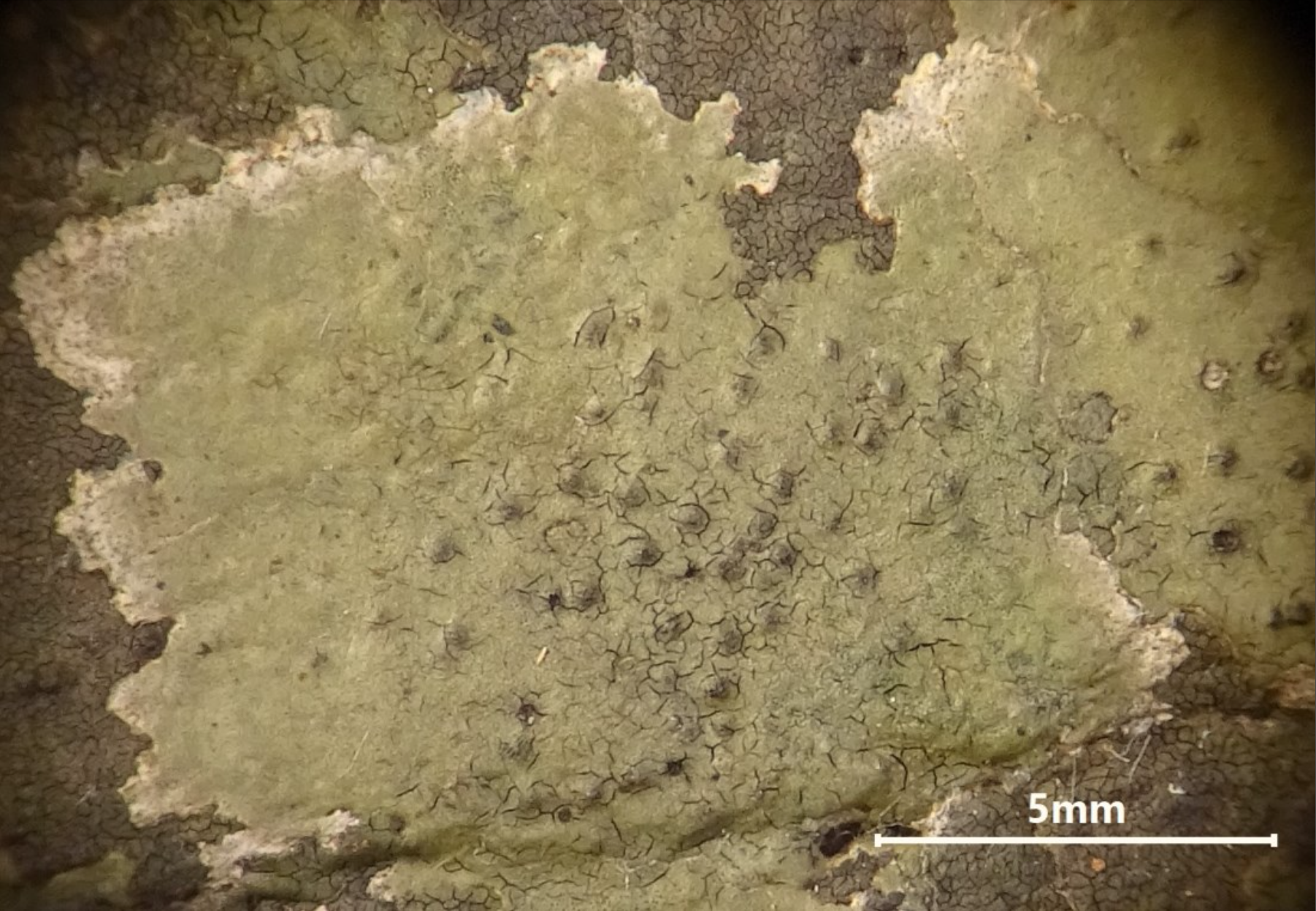
- photographed in Norway

Scientific classification
- Kingdom: Fungi
- Division: Ascomycota
- Class: Eurotiomycetes
- Order: Verrucariales
- Family: Verrucariaceae
- Genus: Hydropunctaria
- Species: H. orae

Binomial name
- Hydropunctaria orae Orange (2012)
- Holotype: St Brides, Wales

= Hydropunctaria orae =

Species of lichen

Hydropunctaria orae is a species of saxicolous (rock-dwelling), crustose lichen in the family Verrucariaceae. It is a marine lichen. It forms thin, dull mid-green to dark greenish-grey crusts on coastal rock surfaces, particularly in areas that receive slight moisture from rainfall. Although difficult to distinguish from related species without DNA analysis, it can be identified by its green cortical pigments and minutely roughened surface texture. Initially known only from two localities in the British Isles, the species was later discovered in southwestern Norway in 2014. It occupies specific ecological niches within coastal environments, including both seashore rocks and stones in freshwater streams near the shore.

== Taxonomy ==
It was formally described as a new species in 2012 by the British lichenologist Alan Orange. The type specimen was collected near Haverfordwest (Pembrokeshire, Wales), where it was found growing on steep rocks on northwest-facing seashore. It has also been recorded in Ireland. The species epithet orae is derived from the Latin ora ("coast" or "edge").

While superficially similar to other species in the genus Hydropunctaria, molecular studies have confirmed it as a distinct species. H. orae is most closely related to H. aractina, with the two species being difficult to distinguish without DNA analysis. The supposed separate geographical distributions of these species may provide a clue to their identity when molecular data is unavailable.

== Description ==
Hydropunctaria orae is a crustose lichen species with a thin to moderately thick body (thallus) measuring about 40–100 μm in thickness. The thallus appears dull mid-green to dark greenish-grey in colour. In thinner areas, the surface typically lacks cracks, while thicker regions may develop few to numerous cracks, though these rarely form completely discrete segments or "islands" (areoles) of thallus tissue. A distinctive characteristic of this species is its minutely roughened surface texture, created by low dots (punctae) about 20–40 μm wide. These punctae occasionally form small ridges measuring up to 80 by 30 μm. The punctae are either the same colour as the surrounding thallus or appear darker in specimens growing in shaded conditions.

Examining the internal structure, the thallus consists of cells arranged in vertical columns. In the upper portion of the thallus, these cells measure roughly 20–40 by 16–33 μm, sometimes with slightly thickened cell walls. A protective outer layer (pseudocortex) is present, with a surface layer about 5 μm thick that may contain dull green pigmentation that does not change colour when potassium hydroxide solution (K) is applied.

The lower part of the thallus contains few or no living algal cells, with those present often containing large oil droplets. Densely pigmented and relatively discrete punctae project upward from the basal layer into the green algal layer, occasionally reaching the thallus surface. These contain dark reddish-brown pigment that turns dark greyish-brown when K is applied. Sometimes a colourless decomposed cell layer (epinecral layer) up to 5 μm thick covers the surface, comprising collapsed and barely recognisable cell remains. The photobiont cells (algal partner) are relatively large, measuring 50–105 by 37–90 μm.

The reproductive structures (perithecia) form low to moderately projecting, and occasionally rather prominent, warts in the thallus measuring 300–840 μm in diameter. These have rounded tops, rarely depressed, with inconspicuous openings (ostioles). Inside, the spore-producing sacs (asci) each contain 8 spores and measure about 43–52 by 21–26 μm. The perithecia have a well-developed protective covering (involucrellum) that merges with the dark basal tissue. The inner spore-producing chamber (exciple) measures 260–270 μm in diameter. The spores (ascospores) are oblong-ellipsoid in shape, simple, colourless, and filled with small oil droplets when mature. They measure approximately 145–175 μm long by 70–80 μm wide, with a length-to-width ratio of about 19–25:1.

== Habitat and distribution ==
Hydropunctaria orae occupies specific niches within coastal environments. It can be found growing on rock surfaces ranging from gently sloping to steep along the seashore, showing a particular preference for areas that receive slight moisture from rainfall. The species has also been documented growing on stones in freshwater streams in immediate proximity to the seashore. At the time of its original description, H. orae had a highly restricted known distribution, being confirmed from only two localities in the British Isles: one site in South Wales and another in southwestern Ireland. Since then, the species has been discovered in Fennoscandia, with a specimen collected in 2014 from Rennesøy, Rogaland county, in southwestern Norway. This Norwegian specimen was found growing on a shady rock wall subjected to freshwater seepage in a maritime ash (Fraxinus excelsior)-dominated woodland situated close to an exposed shoreline. The identity of this specimen was confirmed through DNA sequencing of the internal transcribed spacer region.
