= Jannaschia faecimaris =

Scientific classification
- Domain: Bacteria
- Kingdom: Pseudomonadati
- Phylum: Pseudomonadota
- Class: Alphaproteobacteria
- Order: Rhodobacterales
- Family: Rhodobacteraceae
- Genus: Jannaschia
- Species: J. faecimaris

Binomial name
- Jannaschia faecimaris Jung and Yoon 2014

Type strain
- CCUG 63415, HD-22, KCTC 32179

Species of bacterium

Jannaschia faecimaris is a Gram-negative and non-motile bacterium from the genus of Jannaschia which has been isolated from tidal flat sediments from Yellow Sea from Hwang-do in Korea.
