= Jannaschia =

Scientific classification
- Domain: Bacteria
- Kingdom: Pseudomonadati
- Phylum: Pseudomonadota
- Class: Alphaproteobacteria
- Order: Rhodobacterales
- Family: Rhodobacteraceae
- Genus: Jannaschia; Wagner-Dobler et al. 2003

Species
- J. aquimarina Park and Yoon 2012; J. confluentis Park et al. 2018; J. cystaugens Adachi et al. 2004; J. donghaensis Yoon et al. 2007; J. faecimaris Jung and Yoon 2014; J. formosa Zhang et al. 2019; J. helgolandensis Wagner-Döbler et al. 2003; J. marina Chen et al. 2021; J. pohangensis Kim et al. 2008; J. rubra Macián et al. 2005; J. seohaensis Yoon et al. 2010; J. seosinensis Choi et al. 2006

Synonyms
- "Thalassobacter" Nogami et al. 1997; Thalassobacter Macián et al. 2005

Genus of bacteria

Jannaschia is a genus of the bacteria in the family Rhodobacteraceae.

== Name ==
The genus is named for Holger W. Jannasch, a German microbiologist described as "one of the pioneers of marine microbiology".
