= Reinsch =

Reinsch is a Germanic surname. It may refer to:

- Diether Roderich Reinsch (born 1940), a German Byzantinist
- Gabriele Reinsch (born 1963), a German track and field athlete
- Hugo Reinsch (1809–1884), a German chemist and botanist
- J. Leonard Reinsch (1908–1991), an American broadcasting executive
- Paul Friedrich Reinsch (1836–1914), a botanist
- Paul Samuel Reinsch (1869–1923), an American political scientist and diplomat
- William Alan Reinsch (born 1947), an American government official
