= Jannaschia pohangensis =

Scientific classification
- Domain: Bacteria
- Kingdom: Pseudomonadati
- Phylum: Pseudomonadota
- Class: Alphaproteobacteria
- Order: Rhodobacterales
- Family: Rhodobacteraceae
- Genus: Jannaschia
- Species: J. pohangensis

Binomial name
- Jannaschia pohangensis Kim et al. 2008

Type strain
- DSM 19073, KACC 11609, strain H1-M8

Species of bacterium

Jannaschia pohangensis is a Gram-negative, aerobic and motile bacterium from the genus of Jannaschia which has been isolated from seashore sand from Pohang in Korea.
