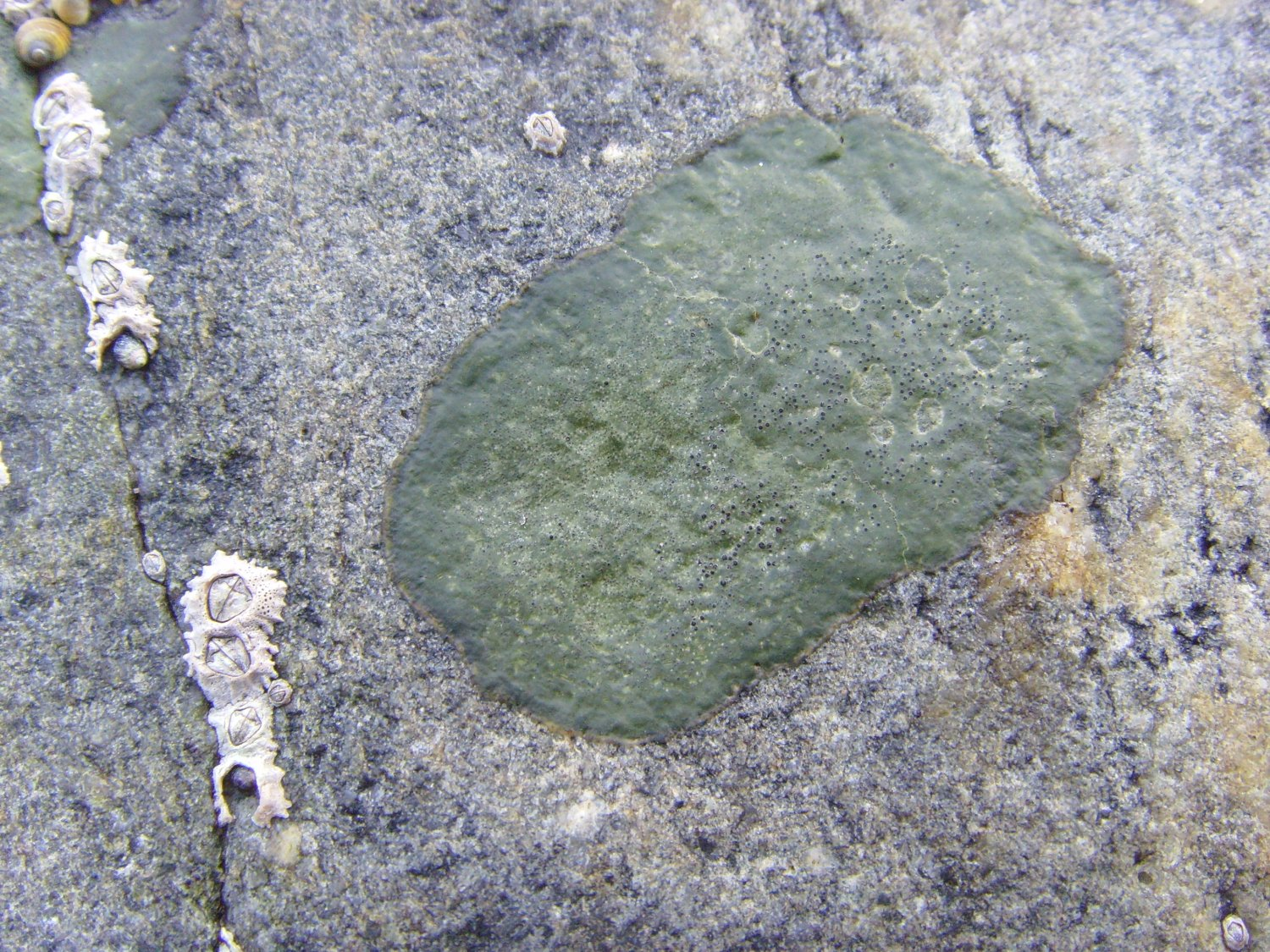
- Wahlenbergiella mucosa in France

Scientific classification
- Domain: Eukaryota
- Kingdom: Fungi
- Division: Ascomycota
- Class: Eurotiomycetes
- Order: Verrucariales
- Family: Verrucariaceae
- Genus: Wahlenbergiella; Gueidan & Thüs (2009)

Type species
- Wahlenbergiella mucosa (Wahlenb.) Gueidan & Thüs (2009)

Species
- W. mucosa W. striatula W. tavaresiae

= Wahlenbergiella =

Genus of lichens

Wahlenbergiella is a small genus of saxicolous (rock-dwelling), crustose lichens in the family Verrucariaceae. It comprises three species, all of which live in marine intertidal zones on exposed, nutrient-poor rocky shores where they get periodically immersed in seawater. Wahlenbergiella closely resembles another lichen genus that includes marine species, Hydropunctaria.

== Taxonomy ==
Wahlenbergiella was circumscribed in 2009 by Cécile Gueidan and Holger Thüs as part of a molecular revision of the family Verrucariaceae. They initially included two species: The authors selected W. mucosa—a lichen first described by the Swedish naturalist Göran Wahlenberg in 1803—as the type species, the standard against which the genus is defined. Their new genus initially housed two intertidal lichens, W. mucosa and W. striatula, both of which had long been misplaced in the catch-all genus Verrucaria.

The pair were segregated from their closest marine relative, Hydropunctaria, because they share a cluster of distinctive characters: tiny, single-celled ascospores (always under 12 μm long), a jelly-like thallus that becomes translucent when wet, and a greatly reduced or missing protective outer layer (upper cortex). These traits reflect adaptation to the splash-zone environment and provide recognizable field marks for non-specialists. A subsequent DNA study in 2011 showed that Verrucaria tavaresiae—a lichenised fungus from central California partnered with the brown alga Petroderma maculiforme—belongs in the same lineage. The species was accordingly transferred as Wahlenbergiella tavaresiae, expanding the genus to three accepted members.

== Description ==
Wahlenbergiella forms a thin, crust-like growth that clings tightly to wave-washed rocks. When the lichen is dry the surface looks smooth or cracked and ranges from dark green to grey-yellow-green; after a tide or rain it turns transparent green at the still-growing margins, giving the thallus a jelly-like sheen. In some colonies the crust is broken by low black ridges or reduced to tiny, dot-like patches scattered across the stone. Unlike many lichens, it has little or no protective upper skin (cortex), so the algal partner sits at the surface. Two of the three species house the green alga Dilabifilum; one Mediterranean species instead incorporates the brown algal species Petroderma maculiforme. The algal layer may be arranged in neat vertical columns of fungal threads, and beneath it there is either no separate medulla or one that looks much the same as the algal zone.

Reproduction takes place in minute, flask-shaped fruit-bodies (perithecia) that are partly buried in the thallus or sit like tiny black specks on top. Their outer wall is pale to jet black and capped by a reduced lid (involucrellum). Inside, the spore-bearing tissue (hymenium) is colourless but turns blue when a drop of potassium iodide is applied. Short sterile threads (periphyses and periphysoids) weave through the hymenium, while the club-shaped asci each contain eight spores of the Verrucaria type. These ascospores are single-celled, colourless and small—usually less than 12 μm long, either nearly round or slightly elongated. Asexual reproduction occurs in comparable flask-like structures (pycnidia) that release slender, rod-shaped conidia through a dark pore.

== Habitat and distribution ==
Wahlenbergiella carpets wave-washed siliceous rock in the mid-littoral zone, enduring regular immersion and drying; its cortex-poor, sub-gelatinous thallus is a physiological adaptation to this harsh intertidal setting. The two original species, W. mucosa and W. striatula, were described from Finnmark in Arctic Norway and remain most frequent on cool-temperate North Atlantic coasts, but they also reach Cape Ann, Massachusetts, and the Haida Gwaii archipelago on Canada's Pacific shore. The third member, W. tavaresiae, occupies a much narrower range, having been recorded only from a few upper-intertidal sandstone ledges around San Francisco Bay, central California.

== Species ==
Three species are accepted in Wahlenbergiella:

- Wahlenbergiella mucosa (Wahlenb. ex Ach.) Gueidan & Thüs (2009)
- Wahlenbergiella striatula (Wahlenb.) Gueidan & Thüs (2009)
- Wahlenbergiella tavaresiae (R.L.Moe) Gueidan, Thüs & Pérez-Ort. (2011)
