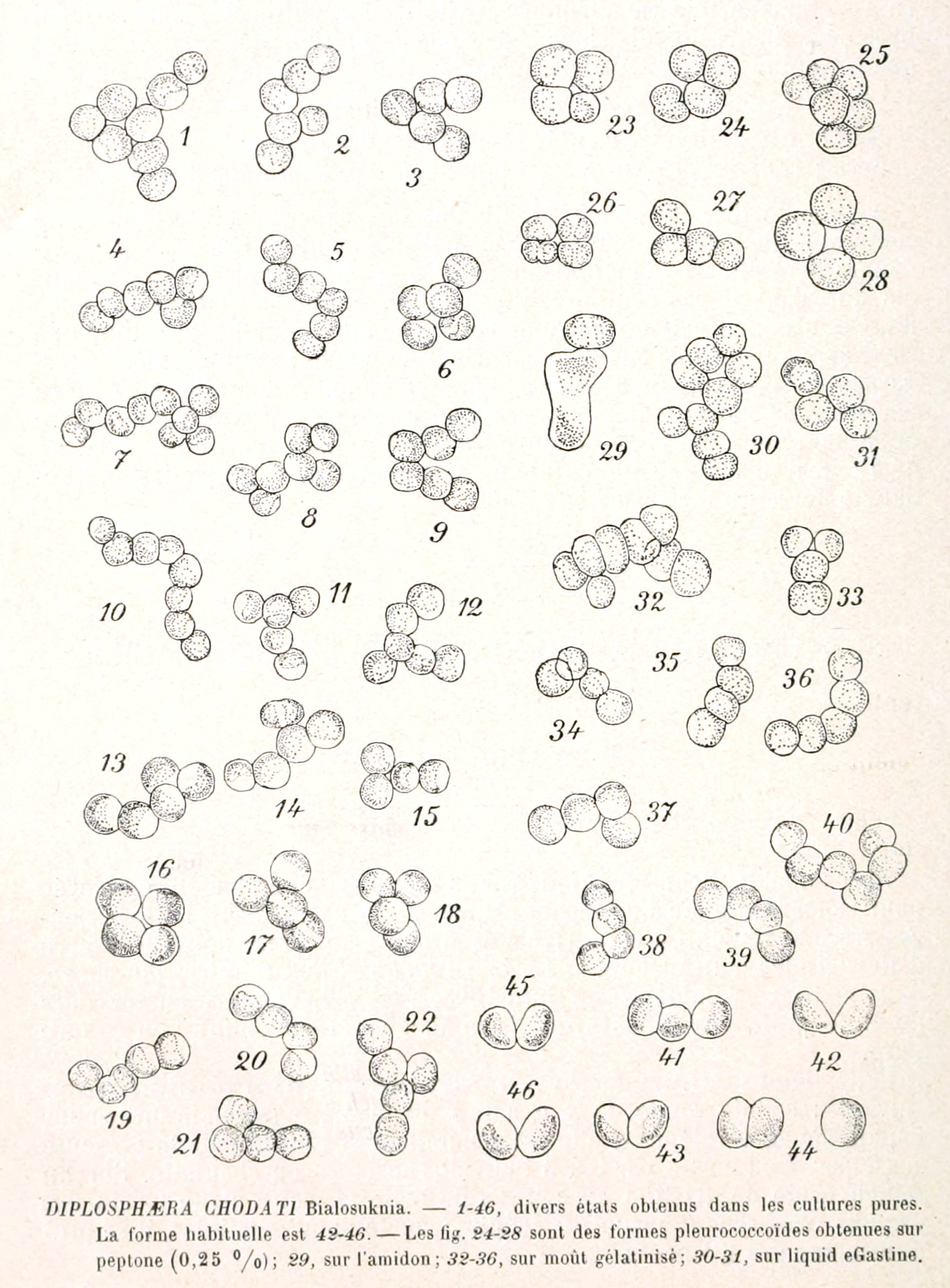

Scientific classification
- Clade: Viridiplantae
- Division: Chlorophyta
- Class: Trebouxiophyceae
- Order: Prasiolales
- Family: Stichococcaceae
- Genus: Diplosphaera; M. W. Bialosuknia, 1909

Type species
- Diplosphaera chodati

Species
- Diplosphaera chodati

= Diplosphaera =

Genus of algae

Diplosphaera is a genus of green algae in the family Stichococcaceae.
