= Göran Wahlenberg =

Swedish naturalist (1780–1851)

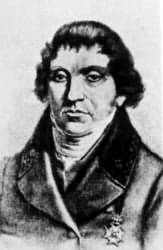
- Born: Göran Wahlenberg; 1 October 1780; Kroppa, Värmland County
- Died: 22 March 1851 (aged 70); Uppsala
- Other name: Georg Wahlenberg
- Education: Uppsala University
- Occupations: Chair of Botany and Medicine
- Employer: Uppsala University
- Known for: Plant geography
- Predecessor: Carl Peter Thunberg
- Scientific career
- Author abbrev. (botany): Wahlenb.

Georg (Göran) Wahlenberg (1 October 1780 – 22 March 1851) was a Swedish naturalist. He was born in Kroppa, Värmland County.

Wahlenberg matriculated at Uppsala University in 1792, received his doctorate in Medicine in 1806, was appointed botanices demonstrator in 1814, and professor of medicine and botany in 1829, succeeding Carl Peter Thunberg. He was the last holder of the undivided chair that in the previous century had been held by Linnaeus. After his death in 1851, the chair was divided into more delimited professorships, and botany became the main duty of the borgströmian professorship, at the time held by Elias Fries.

Wahlenberg made his main work in the field of plant geography and published, among other things the Flora lapponica (1812) and other works on the plant world of northernmost Sweden. He was among the first major scholars to contribute to the plant taxonomy and geography of the High Tatras in the Habsburg monarchy where he carried out research in 1813 (he also determined mountain elevations, but some were later disproved by Ludwig Greiner). Two of the highest mountain lakes in the Tatras, now in Slovakia, are named Upper Wahlenberg Tarn (Vyšné Wahlenbergovo pleso; elevation 2,157 m or 7,077 ft) and Lower Wahlenberg Tarn (Nižné Wahlenbergovo pleso; 2,053 m or 6,736 ft) in his memory.

Wahlenberg also contributed to lichen taxonomy. According to Per Magnus Jørgensen, Erik Acharius received a manuscript from Wahlenberg describing new lichens collected on his 1802 expedition in northern Scandinavia and issued it as a separately printed supplement to Methodus qua omnes detectos lichenes (1803). The supplement introduced 27 valid lichen names attributed to "Wahlenb. in Ach.", including species such as Verrucaria maura.

Wahlenberg was elected a member of the Royal Swedish Academy of Sciences in 1808.

The flowering plant genus Wahlenbergia and the crustose lichen genus Wahlenbergiella are named after him, as was a species of wood-rush: Luzula wahlenbergii. He died in Uppsala.

== See also ==
- Category:Taxa named by Göran Wahlenberg
- Wahlenbergfjord, a fjord named in his honour.
