= Alan Orange =

British lichenologist (1955–2023)

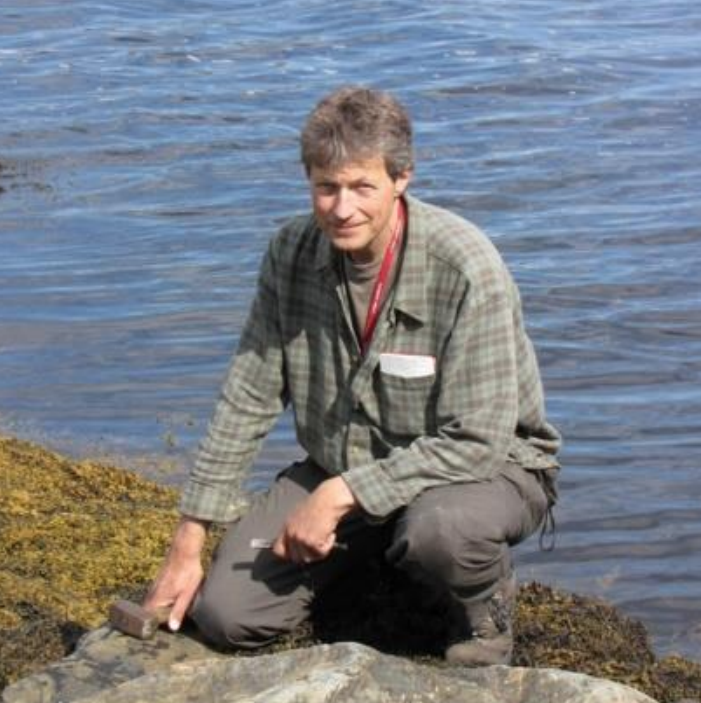
- Born: 19 June 1955; Leeds, England
- Died: 5 February 2023 (aged 67)
- Education: University of Bristol, University of Reading
- Scientific career
- Fields: Lichenology
- Workplaces: National Museum of Wales
- Author abbrev. (botany): Orange

Alan Orange (19 June 1955 – 5 February 2023) was a British lichenologist. His research interests included lichen taxonomy and phylogenetics, aquatic lichens, and the family Verrucariaceae.

== Early life and education ==
Alan Orange was born in Leeds on 19 June 1955, and shortly after, his family relocated to Longhope in the Forest of Dean. This environment fostered his passion for botanical exploration, often accompanied by cousins and the family dogs. His penchant for collecting and classifying challenging organisms began in childhood, evident from his extensive bramble collection. Additionally, he showcased a natural talent for art, crafting intricate botanical illustrations throughout his life. Pursuing his passion academically, he completed his undergraduate studies at Bristol University, followed by a master's degree in pure and applied plant taxonomy at Reading University, earning it with distinction.

== Career and contributions ==
In the early 1980s, Orange worked as a field botanist at the University of Wales Institute of Science and Technology. Here, he conducted botanical surveys on several rivers, becoming particularly captivated by the diverse world of aquatic lichens. His meticulous surveys for the Nature Conservancy at Lady Park Wood became foundational for subsequent ecological research. By 1986, he was appointed as the Curator of Lichens at the National Museum of Wales (NMW, later Amgueddfa Cymru – Museum Wales), producing many resources, including a beginner's guide to tree lichens. In 2013, he transitioned to an honorary research fellow at NMW, continuing his consulting work for several renowned institutions.

His work encompassed various facets of lichenology, from detailed taxonomical studies to genetic research. Throughout his career, he made significant contributions to the knowledge of sterile crusts, aquatic lichens, and Verrucariaceae taxonomy. He also utilised molecular techniques to delve deeper into lichen taxonomy, further refining the understanding of this field. His commitment to freshwater lichen studies culminated in the publication of several comprehensive reports and surveys, which included many descriptions of newly discovered species. Orange was also on the board of editors at the scientific journal The Lichenologist, and was a member of the editorial team for the Lichens of Great Britain and Ireland series. He was the first author for the contributions on the family accounts of Porinaceae, Trapeliaceae and Verrucariaceae. In this work, published after his death, he was described by his coauthors as "a prolific author and a world-renowned specialist in the Verrucariaceae, combining expertise in molecular phylogenetics with meticulous morphological observation."

== Legacy ==
Alan Orange died on 5 February 2023 at the age of 67. His unexpected death deeply resonated within the British Lichen Society and the global lichenologist community. Beyond his scientific contributions, those who collaborated with Alan benefited from his keen observational skills, wide species identification capabilities, and the meticulous detail he brought to his work. His lifelong partner, Dr. Ingrid Jüttner, collaborated on many of his later projects. Those who interacted with Alan remember him not just for his prodigious knowledge but also for his unique humour and willingness to assist in navigating complex taxonomical challenges. His dedication to collecting in the field was noted by colleagues in the meeting report: "The quietly purposeful Alan Orange had to be almost carried away protesting; such was his dedication to the business of relevés and quadrats–often attempted on his knees in the most gloomy and unprepossessing of sites".

The Falkland Islands endemic lichen Imsharria orangei was named in his honour in 2024.

== See also ==
- Category:Taxa named by Alan Orange

== Selected publications ==
- Orange, A. (1994). Lichens on Trees. A Guide to Some of the Commonest Species. British Plant Life. Vol. 3. Cardiff: National Museum of Wales. ISBN 978-0-7200-0400-7.
- Orange, A.; James, P. W.; White, F. J. (2010). Microchemical Methods for the Identification of Lichens. London: British Lichen Society. ISBN 978-0-9540-4189-2.
- Orange, Alan (2013). "Four new species of Verrucaria (Verrucariaceae, lichenized Ascomycota) from freshwater habitats in Europe". The Lichenologist. 45 (3): 305–322. doi:10.1017/s0024282912000898.
- Orange, Alan (2018). "A new species-level taxonomy for Trapelia (Trapeliaceae, Ostropomycetidae) with special reference to Great Britain and the Falkland Islands". The Lichenologist. 50 (1): 3–42. doi:10.1017/s0024282917000639.
- Orange, A.; Cannon, P.; Prieto, M.; Coppins, B.; Sanderson, N.; Simkin, J. (2023). Verrucariales: Verrucariaceae, including the genera Agonimia, Atla, Bagliettoa, Catapyrenium, Dermatocarpon, Endocarpon, Henrica, Heteroplacidium, Hydropunctaria, Involucropyrenium, Merismatium, Nesothele, Normandina, Parabagliettoa, Placidiopsis, Placidium, Placopyrenium, Polyblastia, Psoroglaena, Sporodictyon, Staurothele, Thelidium, Trimmatothele, Verrucaria, Verrucula, Verruculopsis and Wahlenbergiella. Revisions of British and Irish Lichens. Vol. 31. British Lichen Society. pp. 1–104.
