= Cécile Gueidan =

Lichenologist and taxonomist

- Born: Alsace, France
- Scientific career
- Thesis: (2007)
- Author abbrev. (botany): Gueidan

Cécile Gueidan is a mycologist and lichenologist who applies morphological and molecular biological methods to the origin and taxonomy of fungi that live in lichen symbioses and within rocks.

== Early life and education ==
Gueidan began working on lichens during her Maitrise (1998) and DEA (1999) qualifications from Université Louis Pasteur and National Museum of Natural History, France. This included practical fieldwork experience with Claude Roux.

She then studied molecular methods for lichen taxonomy at Duke University, USA and applied them to pyrenocarpous and Verrucariaceae lichens. Through combining morphological and molecular characters, she was able to refine the taxonomy of these groups. She was awarded her doctorate for this research in 2007.

== Career ==
Her research focuses on the evolution and taxonomy of lichenised fungi and other ascomycete fungi.

After gaining her doctorate, Gueidan carried out research at the Westerdijk Institute in the Netherlands on relationships between ascomycete fungi that inhabit rock and others involved in lichen symbioses. She then continued research into lichens within the family Verrucariaceae and related fungi at the Natural History Museum in London between 2010 and 2014. Since 2013 she has been a team leader at the Australian National Herbarium, part of the Commonwealth Scientific and Industrial Research Organisation (CSIRO).

== Publications ==
Gueidan is the author or co-author of at least 65 scientific publications including:

- Robert C Godfree; Nunzio Knerr; Francisco Encinas-Viso; et al. (2021). "Implications of the 2019–2020 megafires for the biogeography and conservation of Australian vegetation" (PDF). Nature Communications. 12 (1023): 1–13. Bibcode:2021NatCo..12.1023G. doi:10.1038/s41467-021-21266-5. PMC 7884386. PMID 33589628. Wikidata Q112328760.
- Cécile Gueidan; Sanja Savić; Holger Thüs; et al. (2009). "Generic Classification of the Verrucariaceae (Ascomycota) Based on Molecular and Morphological Evidence: Recent Progress and Remaining Challenges" (PDF). Taxon. 58 (1): 184–208, 184-208. doi:10.1002/tax.581019. JSTOR 27756834. Wikidata Q114592107.
- Cécile Gueidan; Claude Roux; François Lutzoni (2007). "Using a multigene phylogenetic analysis to assess generic delineation and character evolution in Verrucariaceae (Verrucariales, Ascomycota)" (PDF). Mycological Research. 111 (Pt 10): 1145–1168. doi:10.1016/j.mycres.2007.08.010. PMID 17981450. Wikidata Q34709181.
- David Hibbett; Manfred Binder; Joseph F. Bischoff; et al. (2007). "A higher-level phylogenetic classification of the Fungi". Mycological Research. 111 (Pt 5): 509–547. doi:10.1016/j.mycres.2007.03.004. PMID 17572334. Wikidata Q28306496.
- Timothy Y. James; Frank Kauff; Conrad L. Schoch; et al. (2006). "Reconstructing the early evolution of Fungi using a six-gene phylogeny". Nature. 443 (7113): 818–822. doi:10.1038/nature05110. PMID 17051209. Wikidata Q21972837.
- Daillant, O., Gueidan, C., Roche, F., Nicolas, M and Nicolas F. (2001) Observation des lichens et évolution de la qualité de l’air dans l’agglomération de Mâcon. Terre Vive 122 13-22.

== Honours and awards ==
In 2010/11 Gueidan received the Elias Magnus Fries Medal. This is an award for the quality and quantity of research by an early career mycologist working in Europe from the International Mycological Association. The lichen species Ocellularia gueidaniana was named in her honour in 2015.

== See also ==
- Category:Taxa named by Cécile Gueidan
