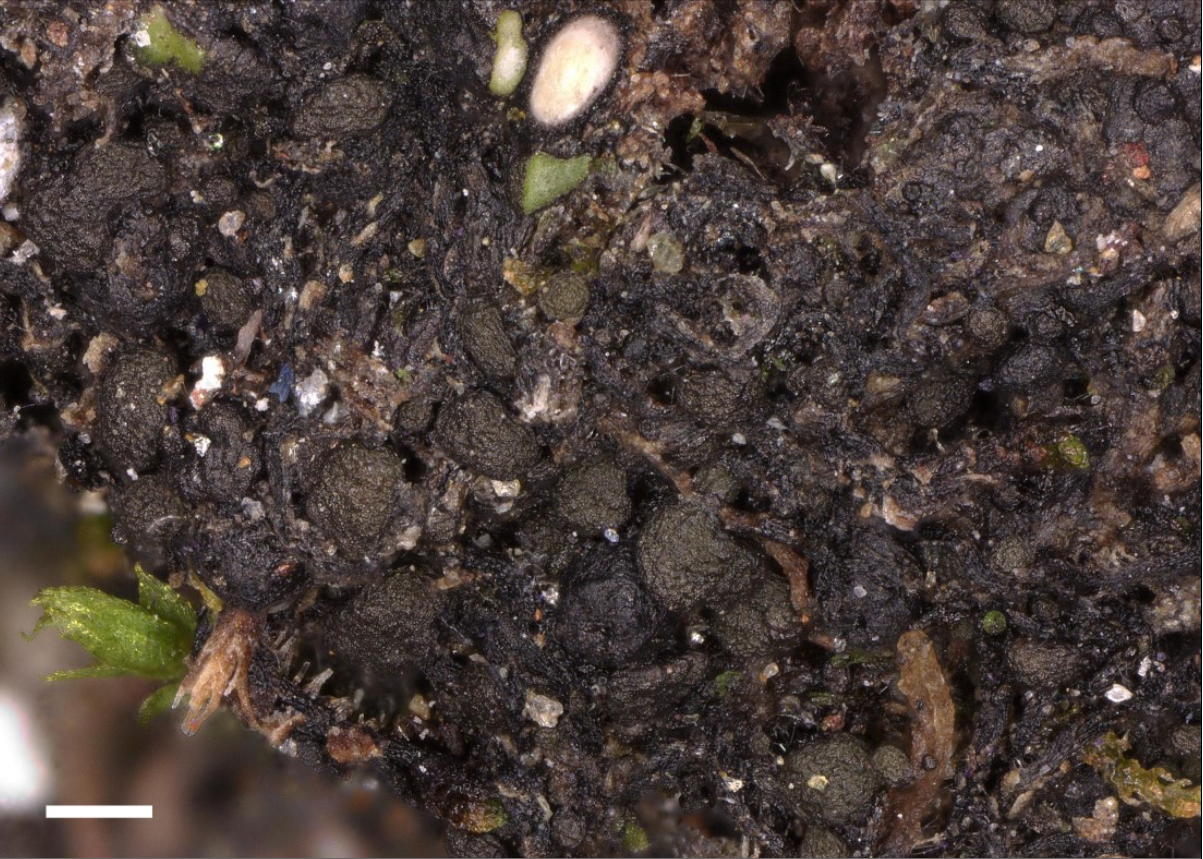
- Scale bar: 0.25 mm

Scientific classification
- Kingdom: Fungi
- Division: Ascomycota
- Class: Dothideomycetes
- Order: Collemopsidiales
- Family: Xanthopyreniaceae
- Genus: Frigidopyrenia; Grube (2005)
- Species: F. bryospila

Binomial name
- Frigidopyrenia bryospila (Nyl.) Grube (2005)

Synonyms
- List: Verrucaria bryospila Nyl. (1864); Arthopyrenia bryospila (Nyl.) Arnold (1871); Collemopsidium bryospilum (Nyl.) Coppins (2004); Didymella bryospila (Nyl.) H.Magn. (1937); Pseudosagedia bryospila (Nyl.) Makar. (1977); Pyrenocollema bryospilum (Nyl.) Coppins (1992); Pyrenocollema bryospilum (Nyl.) Coppins & H.F.Fox (2001); Thelidium bryospilum (Nyl.) Blomb. & Forssell (1880)

= Frigidopyrenia =

Single-species lichen genus

Frigidopyrenia is a fungal genus in the family Xanthopyreniaceae. It is a monospecific genus, containing the single species Frigidopyrenia bryospila, a subarctic crustose lichen. The species was originally described in 1864 from Arctic Norway but has been moved between various genera over the past 160 years before being placed in its own genus in 2005. Despite its early discovery, Frigidopyrenia remains poorly known and is considered rare in collections, though it may be more widespread than records suggest. The lichen forms tiny dark scales less than half a millimetre across on damp soil, making it easily overlooked in the field. The genus belongs to a lineage of "borderline lichens" within the Dothideomyceta; a 2016 molecular study proposed the order Collemopsidiales for this group.

== Taxonomy ==
Frigidopyrenia was erected by Martin Grube in 2005 to accommodate the subarctic lichen originally described by the Finnish lichenologist William Nylander as Verrucaria bryospila in 1864. Nylander's brief Latin diagnosis describes a thin, dull, dark brown-black thallus with black, slightly protruding (subconical) perithecia about 0.2 mm across, the ostiole depressed; asci usually contain eight colourless, oblong-ovoid spores, though four or even two may occur, the spores 30–44 μm long and 11–12 μm wide, with a single cross-wall; the paraphyses are slender and the hymenial gel is not stained by iodine (i.e. I–/non-amyloid). He recorded the species on mosses at Kåfjord in Northern Norway, based on material collected by Isaac Carroll. Grube made the new combination Frigidopyrenia bryospila and designated Nylander's taxon as the type species.

Grube established the genus after showing that the bryospila taxon had been shuttled among several pyrenocarpous genera—Arthopyrenia, Thelidium, Didymella, Pyrenocollema, and Collemopsidium—but differed from each in key anatomical features and overall thallus form. In particular, the peridial structure and pigmentation, the cylindrical fissitunicate asci, and the presence of tough, brown, connecting hyphae separating squamulose thallus units argued against placement in Collemopsidium, Magmopsis, or Pyrenocollema. Grube noted that molecular data were lacking and thus the broader affinities of Frigidopyrenia remained uncertain; he also pointed out that a recent Alaskan report attributed to F. bryospila actually represented a species of Zwackhiomyces. Together, these points, according to Grube, justified recognising Frigidopyrenia as a monospecific genus for F. bryospila. As of 2017, no molecular sequence data was available for Frigidopyrenia.

A six-locus phylogeny sampling Xanthopyreniaceae-grade genera recovered the clade within Dothideomyceta but left its exact position relative to Arthoniomycetes versus Dothideomycetes unresolved. On morphological and biological grounds the authors erected Collemopsidiales to accommodate the group (noting that Frigidopyrenia fits the concept but still requires sequencing). They also formalised the usage of "borderline lichens" for these simple, cyanobacteria-bearing pyrenocarpous symbioses.

== Description ==
Frigidopyrenia forms a tiny, scale-like thallus: in well-developed material the lichen consists of round to cushion-shaped squamules up to about 0.5 mm across, dark olive to brownish-black, with a compact outer cortical layer of tightly packed cells. The squamules are bound to one another and to the fruiting bodies by tough, brown cords of hyphae (bundles of fungal filaments) about 5–7 μm thick. It typically overgrows plant litter, decaying mosses, or mats of cyanobacteria; its own photosynthetic partner (photobiont) is a unicellular (chroococcoid) cyanobacterium.

The reproductive structures are flask-shaped ascomata (perithecioid pseudothecia), more or less spherical (globose) to broadly pear-shaped, each with a preformed pore (ostiole). The ascoma wall (peridium) is dark chestnut-brown and sharply delimited, with pigment mainly deposited between the wall cells; inside, the hamathecium is a mesh of many thread-like, strongly branched filaments (paraphysoids). The asci are two-walled (fissitunicate), rigid and cylindrical, with the inner wall gradually thickening towards the tip and a distinct apical chamber; the ascospores are colourless (hyaline). A standard laboratory stain (toluidine blue) does not produce the red-violet reaction seen in some superficially similar genera, a feature that helps separate Frigidopyrenia from those lookalikes.

== Habitat and distribution ==
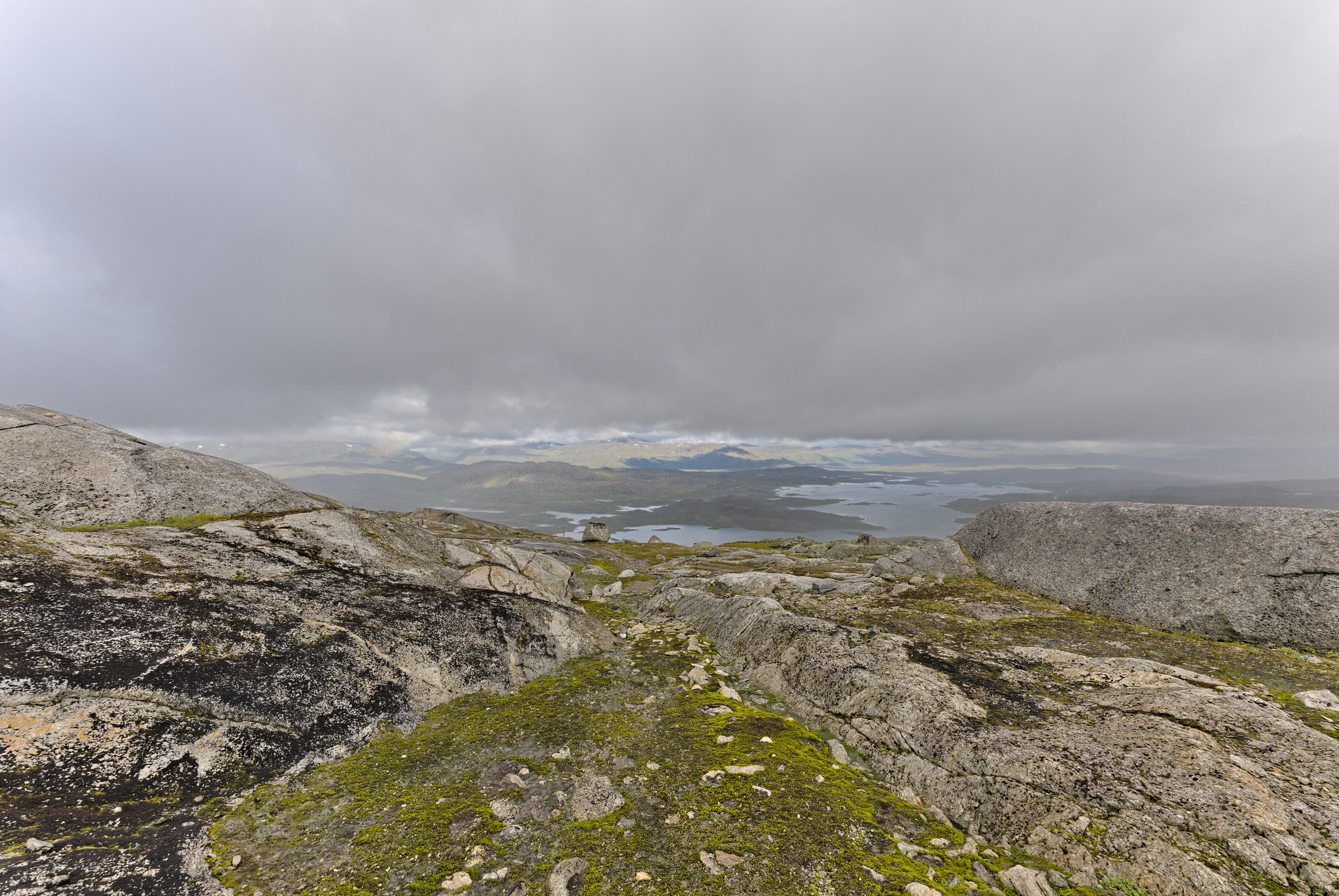
F. bryospila occurs in Vassijaure.

Frigidopyrenia is a terricolous lichen of damp microsites on subarctic and alpine soils. It grows on open, cold-climate ground where moisture lingers, forming minute squamules on earth over decaying mosses, plant detritus, or carpets of cyanobacteria.

The species is considered rare in collections but may be more widespread than records suggest: Grube notes it could be widely distributed on subarctic soils and comparable alpine habitats, yet it has seldom been gathered. Documented material includes the type from Finnmark (northern Norway), from northwestern Finland, further Scandinavian material from Swedish Lapland (Vassijaure, a treeless plain), high-elevation occurrences in Slovakia's Belianske Tatras (about 2,100–2,150 m, on dead mosses), and historical specimens from Port Clarence, Alaska; by contrast, a modern Alaskan report from Barrow proved to be a misidentified Zwackhiomyces.
