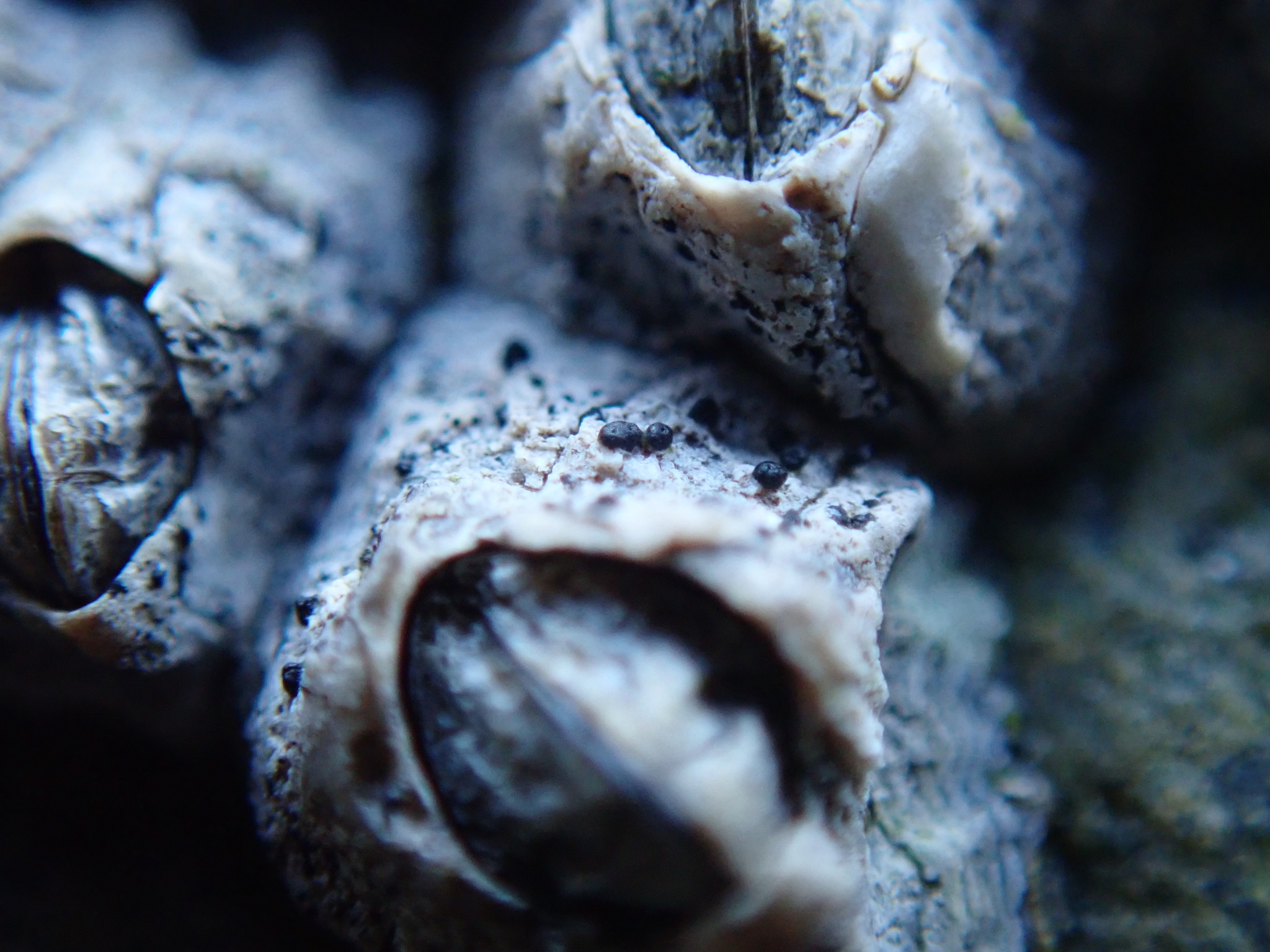
- Perithecia of C. sublitorale appear as black dots on the surface of barnacle shells

Conservation status
- Secure (NatureServe)

Scientific classification
- Kingdom: Fungi
- Division: Ascomycota
- Class: Dothideomycetes
- Order: Collemopsidiales
- Family: Xanthopyreniaceae
- Genus: Collemopsidium
- Species: C. sublitorale

Binomial name
- Collemopsidium sublitorale (Leight.) Grube & B.D.Ryan (2002)

Synonyms
- Verrucaria sublitoralis Leight. (1871); Arthopyrenia sublitoralis (Leight.) Arnold (1891); Thelidium sublitorale (Leight.) Erichsen (1942); Pyrenocollema sublitorale (Leight.) R.C.Harris (1992)

= Collemopsidium sublitorale =

Species of lichen

Collemopsidium sublitorale is a species of lichen in the family Xanthopyreniaceae. First described in 1871, it forms a "borderline" symbiotic relationship with cyanobacteria that is less structured than typical lichen partnerships. The species is characterised by an immersed thallus and black, roughly spherical fruiting bodies measuring 0.15–0.55 mm in diameter. It inhabits the intertidal and littoral fringe of marine environments, where it grows exclusively on calcareous surfaces such as limestone and marine shells. Its range includes north-west Europe and the Pacific coast of North America (United States and Canada).

== Taxonomy ==
It was first scientifically described by William Allport Leighton in 1871; he initially classified it in the genus Verrucaria. He described it from specimens found growing on limpet shells (Chthamalus stellatus) on submerged maritime rocks, and considered it a rare species. After having been transferred to the genera Arthopyrenia, Thelidium, Pyrenocollema in various times in its taxonomic history, Martin Grube and Bruce Douglas Ryan reclassified it to Collemopsidium in 2002, giving it its current name.

Molecular phylogenetics analysis of ITS1 rDNA sequences has confirmed C. sublitorale as a distinct monophyletic species. Studies of specimens from both Ireland and Norway have shown that the species maintains consistent genetic and morphological characteristics across its range, despite showing some variation in perithecial size. The species shows clear genetic separation from other marine Collemopsidium species, including C. halodytes and C. foveolatum, even when growing alongside them on the same substrate.

Molecular phylogenetic studies published in 2016 established that C. sublitorale and other members of the genus Collemopsidium belong to the order Collemopsidiales within Dothideomyceta. This order was created to accommodate these marine borderline lichens after genetic analysis showed they formed a distinct lineage that originated around 230 million years ago during the Triassic period. The emergence of these marine lichens coincided with more arid conditions following the Permian-Triassic mass extinction event.

The German vernacular name for this species is Ufer-Leimkernflechte, which roughly translates to "shore glue-kernel lichen", reflecting both its coastal habitat (Ufer meaning shore) and its reproductive structures (Leimkern referring to its kernel-like perithecia).

== Description ==
Collemopsidium sublitorale forms what is known as a "borderline lichen" symbiosis – a relatively loose association with cyanobacteria that is less structured than typical lichen partnerships. It is characterised by an entirely immersed thallus with the photobiont occurring in scattered groups or sometimes absent. Its perithecia (fruiting bodies) measure 0.15–0.55 mm in diameter and are usually sessile and roughly spherical (globose, featuring a conical, black, hemispherical involucrellum that spreads laterally. The perithecia can also be semi-immersed with a flatter, spreading involucrellum. The ascospores measure 15–25 by 5–10 μm. The species produces pycnidia that can range from common to absent, which are either immersed or semi-immersed with a black, flattened involucrellum. Larger pycnidia can be similar in size to smaller perithecia.

== Habitat and distribution ==
Collemopsidium sublitorale is found in the intertidal and littoral fringe of marine environments, where it grows on calcareous substrates such as limestone and the shells of marine organisms. Unlike some related species that also occur on siliceous rock, it is confined to calcareous surfaces. Studies from northwest Europe have documented it along both exposed and sheltered coasts, typically in shaded positions lower on the shore, though it can tolerate a range of light and wave conditions. Along the North Sea coast of Germany it is widespread but much less frequent than its relative C. foveolatum. Outside Europe, NatureServe reports its presence on the Pacific coast of North America (United States and Canada), where it occupies similar lower-shore microhabitats.
