= Zwackhiomyces polischukii =

Scientific classification
- Domain: Eukaryota
- Kingdom: Fungi
- Division: Ascomycota
- Class: Dothideomycetes
- Order: Collemopsidiales
- Family: Xanthopyreniaceae
- Genus: Zwackhiomyces
- Species: Z. polischukii

Binomial name
- Zwackhiomyces polischukii Darmostuk & Khodos. (2017)

Species of lichen

Zwackhiomyces polischukii is a species of lichenicolous (lichen-eating) fungus in the family Xanthopyreniaceae. It occurs in Ukraine, where it parasitises the crustose lichens Bacidia fraxinea and B. rubella.

== Taxonomy ==
The fungus was formally described as a new species in 2017 by Valeriy Darmostuk and Alexander Khodosovtsev. The type specimen was collected from a western slope of Mount Castel (Autonomous Republic of Crimea) at an altitude of 110 m (360 ft); there it was found growing on thalli of Bacidia rubella, which itself was growing on Carpinus betulus. The species epithet polischukii honours Ukrainian virologist, professor Valeriy Polischuk.

== Description ==
Zwackhiomyces polischukii has perithecioid ascomata that are initially immersed in the host thallus, but are only partially immersed in maturity. These small (typically 170–190 μm in diameter) black structures are more or less spherical, and are either scattered throughout the thallus surface or roughly arranged in groups of three to five. The asci are club-shaped (clavate) and measure 65–75 by 12–15.0 μm. They usually have eight spores (some have four), with the spores either lined up in a single row (uniseriate) or in two rows (biseriate). Ascospores are hyaline, ellipsoid with a marked constriction at the single septum, and typically measure 18.0–21.6 by 6.0–7.6 μm.

== Habitat and distribution ==
Bacidia fraxinea and B. rubella are the two known hosts for Zwackhiomyces polischukii. The authors suggest that the association between these species ranges from parasymbiotic (i.e., the lichen supports a fungal species growing in close association with it, without apparent disadvantage) to weakly parasitic, because the fungal presence does not seem to greatly affect the host, causing only slight deformations in the thallus. In one of the recorded cases, a second lichenicolous fungus–Muellerella hospitans–was co-infecting the host.

In addition to Crimea, Zwackhiomyces polischukii has also been recorded in Bakhchysarai, where the host lichen was growing on oak, and from the Podilskyi District, where the host lichen was growing on maple. As of 2019, Zwackhiomyces polischukii is one of 13 species of Zwackhiomyces known to occur in Ukraine.
