= Zwackhiomyces calcariae =

Scientific classification
- Domain: Eukaryota
- Kingdom: Fungi
- Division: Ascomycota
- Class: Dothideomycetes
- Order: Collemopsidiales
- Family: Xanthopyreniaceae
- Genus: Zwackhiomyces
- Species: Z. calcariae

Binomial name
- Zwackhiomyces calcariae (Flagey) Hafellner & Nik.Hoffm. (2000)

Synonyms
- Arthopyrenia calcariae Flagey (1896); Pharcidia calcariae (Flagey) Vouaux (1912)

Species of lichen

Zwackhiomyces calcariae is a species of lichenicolous fungus in the family Xanthopyreniaceae. It was first formally described in 1896 by French lichenologist Camille Flagey, as Arthopyrenia calcariae. Josef Hafellner and Nikolaus Hoffmann transferred it to the genus Zwackhiomyces in 2000. The fungus is parasitic on lichens in genus Aspicilia.
