= Pyrenocollema elegans =

Scientific classification
- Kingdom: Fungi
- Division: Ascomycota
- Class: Dothideomycetes
- Order: Collemopsidiales
- Family: Xanthopyreniaceae
- Genus: Pyrenocollema
- Species: P. elegans

Binomial name
- Pyrenocollema elegans R.Sant. (1992)

Synonyms
- Collemopsidium elegans (R.Sant.) Grube & B.D.Ryan (2002)

Species of lichen-forming fungus

Pyrenocollema elegans is a lichen-forming fungus species that grows in marine environments along rocky coastlines. First recognized in 1937 and formally described by the Swedish lichenologist Rolf Santesson in 1992, it is distinguished by its dark brown thallus that forms rosettes up to 10 mm in diameter bearing characteristic black ridges and warts. The species inhabits the intertidal zone, particularly on siliceous rocks, where it commonly associates with barnacles and other marine lichens. It has a wide geographic distribution, occurring along the Atlantic coast of Europe from Norway to northern Spain, and along the Pacific coasts of North and South America. Originally classified under Arthopyrenia, it was later transferred to Pyrenocollema.

== Taxonomy ==
Pyrenocollema elegans was first described by the Swedish lichenologist Rolf Santesson in 1992, though he had initially recognized the species in 1937 from specimens collected in Hordaland, Norway, which became the type collection. Prior to its formal description, the species appeared in several checklists under the provisional name Arthopyrenia elegans (nom. nud.).

The species belongs to the genus Pyrenocollema, which includes several marine lichens previously classified under Arthopyrenia. Within its genus, P. elegans is distinguished from other members by its characteristic thallus bearing numerous black ridges and warts.

In 2002, Grube and Ryan transferred it to the genus Collemopsidium as C. elegans based on morphological similarities with other marine species in that genus. The species is currently accepted as Pyrenocollema elegans. Molecular phylogenetics analysis published in 2004 showed that the species forms a distinct monophyletic group with strong support, confirming its status as a separate species from other marine lichens in this group. The genetic analysis demonstrated considerable variation between typical P. elegans specimens and morphologically atypical forms, though all specimens formed a cohesive genetic group.

== Description ==
Pyrenocollema elegans is characterized by its distinctive epilithic thallus, which forms rosettes up to 10 mm in diameter. These rosettes may appear either as isolated formations or merge together to create a continuous spread. The thallus has a thin, dark brown base layer that is marked by distinctive black warts measuring 0.1–0.3 mm across, and ridges extending up to 0.15 by 0.7 mm. At the thallus periphery, these ridges form a radiating pattern and appear flattened, while in the central regions, they become more irregular. While typically flat, these ridges can occasionally become raised and sharp, reaching heights of 35–50 μm.

The species produces scattered perithecia (reproductive structures) that are usually sparse but can occasionally be abundant. These perithecia measure 0.1–0.5 mm in diameter and are prominently displayed, with an irregularly somewhat globose shape featuring a flattened to concave top that can sometimes appear deeply urceolate. The internal structure reveals a thallus thickness of 20–50 μm, composed primarily of vertical rows of angular to rounded cells. The photobiont is a cyanobacterium with yellowish-brown cells measuring 3–5.5 μm in diameter.

The reproductive characteristics include fissitunicate asci that are clavate, obclavate, or nearly cylindrical, measuring 40–60 by 12–18 μm. The paraphyses are persistent, branched, and anastomosing, approximately 1 μm thick with sparse septation. Each ascus typically contains 8 colourless, 1-septate spores that are ellipsoid to ovate with rounded ends. The upper cell of these spores is usually slightly broader, and they measure 11.5–20 by 3.5–7 μm, showing no constriction at the septum. Pycnidia have not been observed in this species.

=== Similar species ===
Pyrenocollema elegans can be differentiated from its close relative P. halodytes by the texture of its thin brownish thallus – while P. elegans displays minute to dense warts or ridges, P. halodytes maintains a smooth surface. It also differs from P. sublitoralis in its substrate relationship, as P. elegans grows epilithically (on the surface) even on calcareous rocks, whereas P. sublitoralis grows immersed within calcareous rock or in the shells of barnacles and mollusks.

The species shares some morphological similarities with certain Verrucaria species, particularly V. striatula and V. ditmarsica, but can be distinguished by its 1-septate spores, persistent paraphyses, and K/I-negative hymenium, features that characterise it as a member of Pyrenocollema rather than Verrucaria.

== Habitat, distribution, and ecology ==
Pyrenocollema elegans is a marine lichen that inhabits the intertidal zone of coastal areas. It shows a strong preference for siliceous seashore rocks, particularly those composed of schist or granite, though it occasionally occurs on calcareous substrates. The species typically occupies the lower littoral fringe or the uppermost section of the eulittoral zone (also known as the hydrohaline zone), where it receives regular seawater immersion.

The species has a wide geographic distribution. Along the Atlantic coast of Europe, it ranges from mid-Norway southward to northern Spain. In the Pacific, it has been documented at several locations along the western coasts of North and South America, including California (USA), Peru, and Chile. While no specimens had been recorded from the Atlantic coast of North America as of 1992, its presence there was considered likely but undocumented.

In its typical habitat, P. elegans frequently grows in association with barnacles – specifically Semibalanus balanoides in Norwegian waters and Chthamalus species in more southerly regions. The species shows a preference for exposed rocky areas rather than sheltered locations. While it can exist as the sole lichen species in an area, it commonly forms communities with other marine lichens including Verrucaria striatula, V. ditmarsica, V. halizoa, Wahlenbergiella mucosa, Hydropunctaria amphibia, Pyrenocollema halodytes, and P. sublitoralis.
