= Zwackhiomyces echinulatus =

Scientific classification
- Domain: Eukaryota
- Kingdom: Fungi
- Division: Ascomycota
- Class: Dothideomycetes
- Order: Collemopsidiales
- Family: Xanthopyreniaceae
- Genus: Zwackhiomyces
- Species: Z. echinulatus

Binomial name
- Zwackhiomyces echinulatus Brackel (2008)

Species of lichen

Zwackhiomyces echinulatus is a species of lichenicolous (lichen-dwelling) fungus in the family Xanthopyreniaceae. Thus fungus exclusively colonises the lichen species Physconia distorta. This fungus is notable for specific structural features that distinguish it from other members of its genus, and for its niche habitat found only in particular regions of Sicily, Italy.

== Taxonomy ==
It was dormally described as a new species in 2008 by Wolfgang von Brackel. The etymology of the species name echinulatus is inspired by the echinulate (spiny) ornamentation of its spores, which bears resemblance to those of Pronectria echinulata. The type specimen was found in Sicily, in the Bosco della Ficuzza region near Palermo, growing on the bark of Quercus pubescens hosting the lichen Physconia distorta.

== Description ==
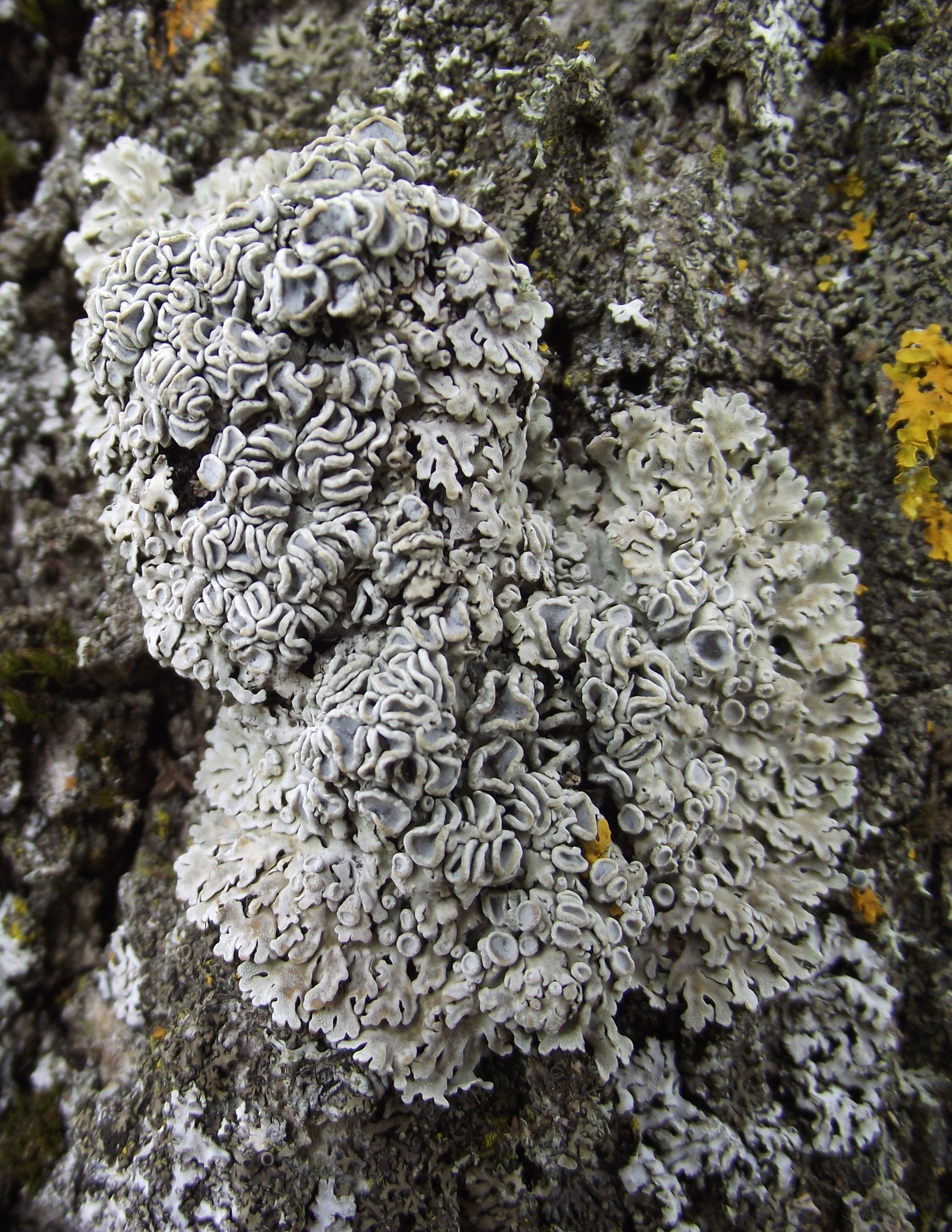
Physconia distorta, shown here, is the sole host for Z. echinulatus

The fungus possesses perithecia that are black, globular structures growing superficially on its host, measuring between 100 and 250 μm in diameter. These structures have walls that are dark brown externally and castaneous brown centrally. The asci, which contain the spores, are cylindrical in shape, typically containing four spores, although instances with six to eight spores have been observed. These spores are hyaline (translucent), later turning a pale brownish hue. Their unique feature, which gives the fungus its name, is an echinulate ornamentation. They measure approximately 24.0–27.4 μm in length and 9.3–11.0 μm in width. This fungus is differentiated from others in its genus by the combination of its 4-spored asci and the specific size of its spores.

== Habitat and distribution ==
Zwackhiomyces echinulatus has a very specialised habitat, being found exclusively on the lichen Physconia distorta. This lichen grows on trees such as Quercus pubescens, Q. cerris and Pyrus amygdaliformis within mixed coppice forests. The fungus has been recorded in a few locations within Sicily, specifically in the Bosco della Ficuzza near Corleone and between Mistretta and Nicosia in the Monti Nebrodi. The presence of this fungus does not seem to harm its lichen host.
