= Zwackhiomyces sipmanii =

Scientific classification
- Kingdom: Fungi
- Division: Ascomycota
- Class: Dothideomycetes
- Order: Collemopsidiales
- Family: Xanthopyreniaceae
- Genus: Zwackhiomyces
- Species: Z. sipmanii

Binomial name
- Zwackhiomyces sipmanii Diederich & Zhurb. (2009)

Species of lichen

Zwackhiomyces sipmanii is a species of lichenicolous fungus in the family Xanthopyreniaceae. Found in the boreal ecosystem of north-eastern Russia, it was formally described as a new species in 2009 by Paul Diederich and Mikhail Zhurbenko. The type specimen was collected in the Magadan Region of Eastern Siberia at an altitude of 700 m (2,300 ft); here, on a south-exposed slope with steppe-like vegetation, the fungus was found growing on the lichen Phaeorrhiza sareptana var. sphaerocarpa. It is only known from the type locality. The species epithet honours Dutch lichenologist Harrie Sipman, "on the occasion of his 64th birthday".
