= Zwackhiomacromyces =

Scientific classification
- Domain: Eukaryota
- Kingdom: Fungi
- Division: Ascomycota
- Class: Dothideomycetes
- Order: Collemopsidiales
- Family: Xanthopyreniaceae
- Genus: Zwackhiomacromyces; Etayo & van den Boom

Type species
- Zwackhiomacromyces constrictocarpus Etayo & van den Boom (2014)

Species
- Z. constrictocarpus Z. hyalosporus

Genus of lichen-dwelling fungi

Zwackhiomacromyces is a genus of lichenicolous (lichen-dwelling) fungi in the family Xanthopyreniaceae. It has two species. The genus is distinguished by its black, pear-shaped fruiting bodies (perithecia) with large, nipple-shaped ostioles that have a granular surface, and a dark, multi-layered wall made up of hyphal cells forming a pseudoparenchymatous structure. The genus is closely related to the similarly named genus Zwackhiomyces.

== Taxonomy ==
The genus was circumscribed in 2014 by the lichenologists Javier Etayo and Pieter van den Boom, with Zwackhiomacromyces constrictocarpus assigned as the type species. A second species, Z. hyalosporus, was transferred to the genus from Pyrenidium in 2016.

== Description ==
Zwackhiomacromyces has black, pear-shaped ascomata (perithecia), which are fungal reproductive structures. These ascomata have relatively large, papilliform (nipple-shaped) ostioles—openings through which spores are released. The surface of these ostioles is granular and opens radially. The wall of the ascomata is dark and multi-layered, made up of hyphal cells that form a pseudoparenchymatous structure, with the outermost layer sometimes having granulose extracellular pigment.

The internal structure of the hymenium (the hamathecium) of these fungi is characterised by branching and interconnected pseudoparaphyses, which are filamentous structures within the ascomata. However, they lack periphyses and periphysoids, which are other types of filaments found in some fungi. The central part of the ascomata does not react to staining with iodine.

The asci (spore-producing cells) of Zwackhiomacromyces are elongated and club-shaped, with a thickened wall on the side and at the tip, where an ocular chamber is present. The ascospores are ellipsoid and typically have three septa (internal partitions), though they can range from having two to three. These spores are hyaline (translucent) and smooth-walled, lacking any subapical germ pore-like spot.

Zwackhiomacromyces is closely related to and often compared with Zwackhiomyces, a genus established in 1990 that comprises around 32 species. The species in this latter genus are characterised by their perithecioid ascomata, branched and interconnected filaments between the asci, fissitunicate asci (having a two-layered wall that splits to release spores), and ascospores usually with a single septum. While the genus is generally uniform in terms of its hamathecial structures, asci, and ascospores, variations do exist in some species, such as Zwackhiomyces lecanorae with its simple spores and Zwackhiomyces cervinae, which features spores with a perispore and a tendency to turn brown.

== Species ==
- Zwackhiomacromyces constrictocarpus Etayo & van den Boom (2014)
- Zwackhiomacromyces hyalosporus (Alstrup, D.Hawksw. & R.Sant.) Etayo & F.Berger (2016)
