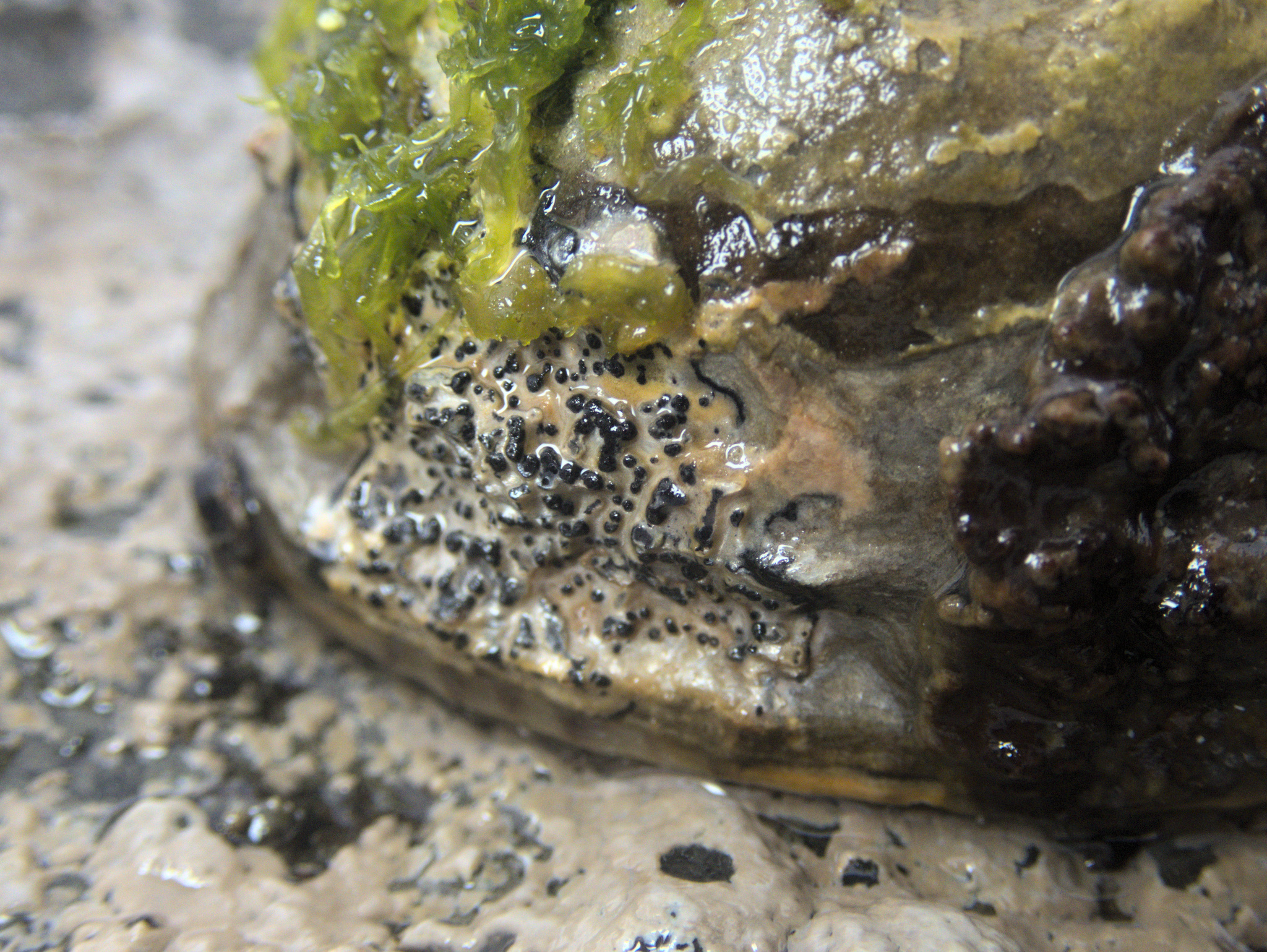

Scientific classification
- Domain: Eukaryota
- Kingdom: Fungi
- Division: Ascomycota
- Class: Dothideomycetes
- Order: Collemopsidiales
- Family: Xanthopyreniaceae
- Genus: Collemopsidium
- Species: C. ostrearum

Binomial name
- Collemopsidium ostrearum (Vain) F.Mohr (2004)

Synonyms
- Lecanactis ostrearum Vain. (1901); Arthoniactis ostrearum (Vain.) C.W.Dodge (1967)

= Collemopsidium ostrearum =

Species of lichen

Collemopsidium ostrearum is a species of lichen.

== Taxonomy ==
The species was originally described by the Finnish lichenologist Edvard August Vainio in 1901. He classified it as a member of the genus Lecanactis. Carroll William Dodge proposed a transfer to Arthoniactis in 1967. Fiona Mohr reclassified it in genus Collemopsidium based on morphological and phylogenetic analysis in 2004.

== Description ==
This is a small species of lichen that lives on oysters, and on calcareous rock. Collemopsidium ostrearum has an immersed thallus, which is occasionally partly bordered by a black prothallus. Its perithecia (fruiting bodies) are immersed, densely clustered, and measure 0.34–0.60 mm in diameter, with ostioles up to 0.17 mm wide. The involucrellum is very wide-spreading and contains particles from the substrate. Multiple perithecia are often united within a single involucrellum. The ascospores measure 23–25 by 9–11 μm. The pycnidia appear similar to the perithecia and overlap with them in size.

== Habitat and distribution ==
Collemopsidium ostrearum grows on calcareous rock and marine shells in the eulittoral zone. The species has been recorded from Ireland, New Zealand, and São Tomé and Príncipe, though its apparent rarity may be due to under-collection rather than true scarcity.
