= Zwackhiomyces parmotrematis =

Scientific classification
- Kingdom: Fungi
- Division: Ascomycota
- Class: Dothideomycetes
- Order: Collemopsidiales
- Family: Xanthopyreniaceae
- Genus: Zwackhiomyces
- Species: Z. parmotrematis

Binomial name
- Zwackhiomyces parmotrematis van den Boom (2018)

Species of fungus

Zwackhiomyces parmotrematis is a species of lichenicolous fungus in the family Xanthopyreniaceae. Found in Suriname, it was formally described as a new species in 2018 by Dutch lichenologist Pieter van den Boom. The type was collected west of Groningen (Saramacca District) in an abandoned Citrus orchard. Here it was found growing on the thallus of Parmotrema praesorediosum. The fungus does not cause visible damage to its host, such as discolouration or the formation of galls; rather, it produces tiny (50–100 μm diameter) black, spherical perithecia that are immersed in the host thallus. The specific epithet parmotrematis refers to the genus of its host lichen.
