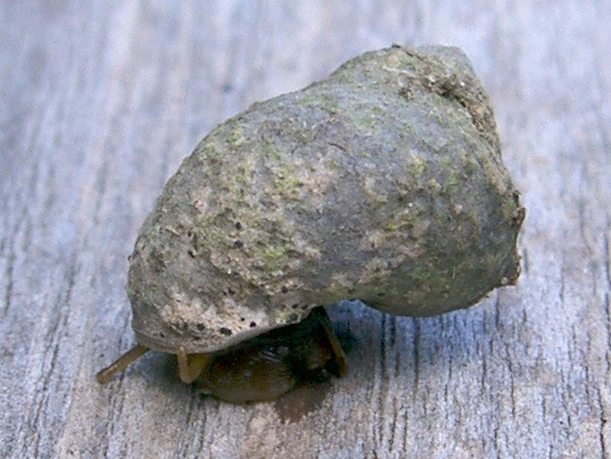
- Pyrenocollema halodytes growing on the snail Littoraria irrorata

Scientific classification
- Kingdom: Fungi
- Division: Ascomycota
- Class: Dothideomycetes
- Order: Collemopsidiales
- Family: Xanthopyreniaceae
- Genus: Pyrenocollema; Reinke (1895)

Type species
- Pyrenocollema tremelloides Reinke (1895)

Species
- P. elegans P. halodytes P. occidentalipamiricum P. orustense P. pelvetiae P. tichothecioides P. tremelloides

= Pyrenocollema =

Genus of lichen-forming fungi

Pyrenocollema is a genus of lichenized fungi in the biological division Ascomycota. The genus was described by German botanist Johannes Reinke in 1895 and has been placed in the family Xanthopyreniaceae. Species in the genus form borderline lichen symbioses with cyanobacteria and are typically found in marine and freshwater environments, growing on rock surfaces or within calcareous substrates such as limestone and the shells of barnacles and limpets. Several species formerly placed in Pyrenocollema have been transferred to the related genus Collemopsidium.

== Taxonomy ==
Pyrenocollema was established by Johannes Reinke in 1895 in his "Abhandlungen über Flechten IV", published in the Jahrbuch für wissenschaftliche Botanik. The genus was created to accommodate certain rock-dwelling (saxicolous) species previously assigned to Arthopyrenia that were distinguished by their association with cyanobacterial photobionts. The type species is Pyrenocollema tremelloides.

The circumscription of Pyrenocollema was later broadened by Richard C. Harris and others, who used the genus for species with slender, anastomosing paraphyses, two-celled ascospores, and cyanobacterial photobionts that had originally been described in Verrucaria or Arthopyrenia. In 2002, Martin Grube and Bruce Ryan narrowed the generic concept by proposing that most lichen-forming species in Pyrenocollema be transferred to Collemopsidium, a genus described by William Nylander in 1881. As a result, several marine species that were widely known under Pyrenocollema names now bear Collemopsidium binomials.

Molecular phylogenetic studies published in 2016 established that Collemopsidium and other members of the Xanthopyreniaceae are placed within the Dothideomyceta, though their relationship to the classes Dothideomycetes and Arthoniomycetes remains unresolved. On this basis, the order Collemopsidiales was erected to accommodate the family.

== Description ==
Species of Pyrenocollema are crustose lichens with a thallus that is typically immersed in or growing upon the surface of the substrate (endolithic or epilithic). The thallus may be inconspicuous or barely visible to the naked eye, appearing as little more than a scattering of dark dots on rock or shell surfaces. The reproductive structures are perithecia—small, dark, flask-shaped fruiting bodies that are sessile or partly immersed in the substrate, with a black involucrellum (a layer of dark tissue surrounding the perithecium). The asci typically measure 50–80 × 15–20 μm, and the ascospores are 1-septate (two-celled), colourless, and fusiform-ovate, measuring approximately 12–20 × 5–10 μm, with the upper cell broader than the lower.

The photobionts of Pyrenocollema species are cyanobacteria, including genera such as Hyella, Gloeocapsa, and Nostoc. Marine species typically associate with the filamentous cyanobacterium Hyella caespitosa, which bores into calcareous substrates. The symbiotic relationship between the fungal and cyanobacterial partners in Pyrenocollema and related genera is characteristically loose—sometimes termed a "borderline lichen" symbiosis—in which the fungal hyphae only partially interact with the cyanobacteria, distinguishing these organisms from more highly organised lichens.

== Habitat and ecology ==
Many Pyrenocollema species are marine lichens found in the intertidal zone, where they colonise calcareous substrates such as limestone, barnacle shells, and limpet shells in the eulittoral and littoral fringe zones. Many species have thalli partly or wholly immersed in rock or shell; endolithic growth has been suggested to help them persist on eroding shores.

The type species, P. tremelloides, differs ecologically from the marine members of the genus; it is a commensal of leafy Nostoc colonies in periodically inundated freshwater habitats. P. pelvetiae is also ecologically distinct, growing on the surface of brown seaweeds such as Pelvetia canaliculata (channelled wrack) rather than on rock or shell.

== Species ==
- Pyrenocollema elegans R.Sant. (1992) – Found on the Atlantic coast of Europe and the Pacific coast of North and South America; distinguished by a dark brown thallus forming rosettes with black ridges and warts.
- Pyrenocollema halodytes (Nyl.) R.C.Harris (1987) – A marine species commonly found on barnacle and limpet shells.
- Pyrenocollema occidentalipamiricum N.S.Golubk. & Bredkina (1971)
- Pyrenocollema orustense (Erichsen) A.Fletcher (1992)
- Pyrenocollema pelvetiae (G.K.Sutherl.) D.Hawksw. (1988) – An algicolous species that grows on brown seaweeds.
- Pyrenocollema tichothecioides (Arnold) R.C.Harris (1980)
- Pyrenocollema tremelloides Reinke (1895) – The type species, associated with freshwater Nostoc colonies.
