= Borderline lichen =

Loosely organized fungal–photobiont symbioses

Borderline lichen is a term used in lichenology for structurally simple, symbiotic associations between a fungus and a photosynthetic partner (an alga or cyanobacterium). Unlike typical lichens, these associations lack a differentiated thallus (vegetative body) and a protective outer cortex. Instead, the fungus forms a loose network of mycelia intertwined with the photosynthetic cells. A defining feature is that the fungal partner triggers visible changes in the arrangement or form of the photobiont's cells, distinguishing borderline lichens from simple fungal colonization. The term was introduced in 2004 by Kohlmeyer, Hawksworth, and Volkmann-Kohlmeyer for certain marine and maritime associations, including Mastodia tessellata and Collemopsidium pelvetiae, that resemble lichens yet lack the organized fungal tissues expected under standard lichen definitions. The concept has since been extended to include fungi that switch between free-living and loosely lichenized modes depending on their substrate (termed "optional lichenization"), bryophyte-associated cyanobacterial systems in which fungal–photobiont contact occurs without organized thallus development, and associations between stress-tolerant fungi and algae in nutrient-poor environments such as caves in the Atacama Desert.

Borderline lichens do not form a single evolutionary group. Instead, they represent a polyphyletic assemblage of fungi from distantly related lineages that have independently evolved symbiotic lifestyles. They have been proposed as present-day analogues of early stages of thallus evolution, before more complex lichen organization arose. Their simple structure has also made them a focus of debate over whether the lichen symbiosis is best understood as a mutualism or as a form of controlled parasitism, because the costs and benefits to each partner are considered more readily observable than in structurally complex lichens. These associations are often described as occupying the transitional zone between free-living organisms and fully integrated lichen symbioses.

== Terminology and conceptual origin ==
The concept of the borderline lichen emerged from long-standing debates over what constitutes a lichen in systematic treatments of lichenized fungi. Historically, many definitions centred on the presence of a thallus: a vegetative body composed of fungal and algal components differing from either partner grown alone. A widely used definition proposed by Hawksworth in 1988 described a lichen as a stable, self-supporting association of a mycobiont and a photobiont in which the mycobiont is the "exhabitant" (the exterior layer) and the alga an interior but extracellular inhabitant.

Borderline cases challenged this model because their fungal partners may be intermixed with, or even within, the photobiont's tissues rather than clearly forming an exterior layer. In a marine context, Kohlmeyer and co-authors used "borderline lichens" for loose, often submerged associations in which the fungal partner does not develop a well-differentiated cortex and is not clearly exhabitant under prevailing definitions. They argued that these associations should still be recognized as lichens because they show specialization involving derived ascomycete orders and because the fungus modifies the algal partner's morphology. In 2001, separate groups led by Kováčik and Pereira and by Lud and co-authors independently investigated the developmental morphology of polar maritime species and concluded that simple organizational levels did not preclude lichen status. Shortly afterwards, the term "optional lichenization" was introduced by Wedin and co-authors in 2004 for fungi that switch between borderline lichenized and saprotrophic modes depending on the substrate.

In a broader synthesis, Lücking and co-authors noted that some lichen-like associations fit the mycobiont–photobiont framework but remain unstable, show little morphogenetic effect, or blur with other categories such as lichenicolous fungi on sterile thalli. They emphasized morphogenesis (a novel morphology not found in the separate bionts) and the photobiont body plan as useful criteria for delimiting borderline and marginal cases. Sanders reviewed these conceptual boundaries, noting that while the "exhabitant" model (where the fungus forms an exterior layer) is standard, many lichens are structurally simpler, especially species growing within bark or rock where the fungus may simply contact algal surfaces without forming specialized tissues. The term "primitive lichen" appears in some older literature as a near-synonym, but modern lichenology generally prefers "borderline" to describe a boundary between different structural and nutritional strategies rather than implying an evolutionary hierarchy.

Key terminology in borderline lichenology
Term	Year	Proposed/popularised by	Context
Mycophycobiosis	1972	Kohlmeyer and Kohlmeyer	Fungi living inside multicellular algae without morphological change
Exhabitant definition	1988	Hawksworth	Fungal partner as the outer layer of the symbiosis
Borderline lichen	2004	Kohlmeyer, Hawksworth and Volkmann-Kohlmeyer	Specialised loose symbioses with modified algal morphology
Optional lichenization	2004	Wedin, Döring and Gilenstam	Fungi switching between saprotrophy and loose lichenization

== Diagnostic characteristics ==
The primary characteristic of borderline lichens is the absence of a structured, stratified thallus. In complex lichens, the fungus builds specialized tissues such as an upper and lower cortex, which protect the photobiont from desiccation and excessive light. The internal structure is typically heteromerous (layered). Borderline lichens lack these features. Instead of forming plectenchyma (dense, tissue-like structures formed by fused hyphae), the fungus maintains an irregular, filamentous network that interweaves with the photosynthetic colonies. In marine borderline lichens, the partners may show specialization and altered photobiont morphology, yet still lack the well-differentiated fungal tissues often treated as characteristic of lichens (except in reproductive structures such as ascomata).

These associations sit between better-defined categories. They differ from mycophycobioses—associations where a fungus lives within an alga without altering its form—because the fungus shows specialization and the photobiont shows noticeable structural changes. What separates borderline lichens from simple fungal infestations is the morphogenetic influence of the mycobiont: the fungal partner triggers changes in the arrangement, division, or morphology of the algal cells. In the association between Mastodia tessellata and Prasiola, for example, the fungus causes the foliose (leaf-like) alga to separate into packets of cells, a pattern not seen in free-living Prasiola.

Borderline lichens often lack the diverse secondary metabolites found in macrolichens. Kohlmeyer and co-authors noted that the Mastodia–Prasiola association does not form secondary lichen substances, consistent with reduced lichen-like organization in the vegetative thallus. However, the fungal partner still produces characteristic reproductive structures such as perithecia, apothecia, and spermogonia, which may be well-developed even when the vegetative thallus is absent or inconspicuous.

Comparison of structural traits: borderline vs. stratified lichens
Feature	Borderline lichen	Stratified/macrolichen
Thallus cortex	Absent or poorly developed	Well-differentiated and conglutinated
Internal stratification	Absent (homoiomerous)	Distinct layers (heteromerous)
Fungal organization	Loose mycelia	Complex plectenchyma
Secondary chemistry	Limited; mostly melanin	Diverse (acids, depsides, depsidones)
Substrate penetration	Often endolithic or endophloeodal	Typically epilithic or epiphytic

== Evolutionary origins and classification ==
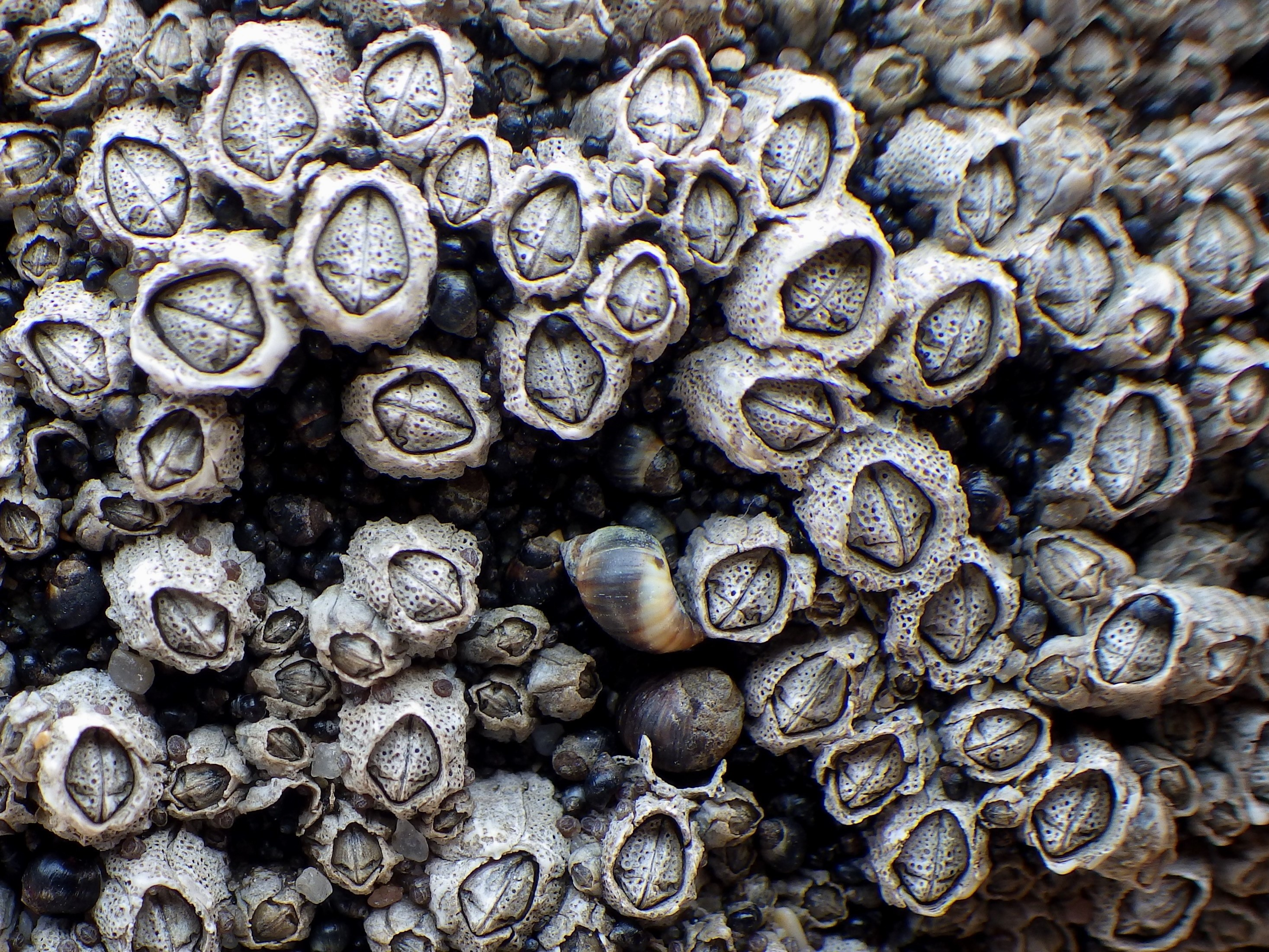
Intertidal barnacle shells colonized by Collemopsidium foveolatum, visible as pepper-like black perithecia

Borderline lichens represent a polyphyletic assemblage of fungi that have independently evolved symbiotic lifestyles. Recent analyses suggest that the lichen-forming lifestyle evolved at least 20 to 30 times independently in more than five different classes of Ascomycota and several orders of Basidiomycota. Borderline and optional lichenization are described as scattered across distant fungal groups, including marine-intertidal lineages such as Collemopsidium and substrate-plastic lineages in Stictidaceae.

In many cases, borderline lichens represent single species within genera or families that are otherwise composed of non-lichenized, saprotrophic, or parasitic fungi, suggesting that the transition to a lichenized mode of nutrition can occur with minimal structural modification. Grube and Wedin interpreted such facultative, substrate-dependent lichenization as a present-day analogue of early stages of thallus evolution, before more advanced forms of organization arose. Muggia and co-authors similarly argued that studying simple borderline forms by observation and experiment may inform understanding of how fungal–algal interactions transition from loose contact to stable, structured lichen symbioses.

=== The order Collemopsidiales ===
A significant development in the classification of borderline lichens occurred in 2016 with the establishment of the order Collemopsidiales within the clade Dothideomyceta. Pérez-Ortega and co-authors described this order to accommodate the family Xanthopyreniaceae, which includes the marine borderline-lichen genus Collemopsidium and the lichenicolous genus Zwackhiomyces. Using five fungal fossils as calibration points (including Paleopyrenomycites devonicus), they inferred a crown age of approximately 230 million years for Collemopsidiales, placing its diversification in the Triassic, shortly after the Permian–Triassic extinction event. The exact phylogenetic position of the family within the Dothideomyceta remains uncertain: six molecular markers were insufficient to assign it with certainty to either Arthoniomycetes or Dothideomycetes.

=== Transitions from saprotrophy ===
The family Stictidaceae illustrates the fluid boundary between saprotrophic and borderline lichenized lifestyles. Some species in this family exhibit optional lichenization, switching from a saprotrophic mode on dead wood to a borderline lichenized mode associating with Coccomyxa algae on bark, depending on the substrate. Ancestral character state analysis for this group indicates that a saprotrophic ancestor was most likely, with lichenization occurring independently in various lineages, suggesting that the evolutionary step between these fungal lifestyles is smaller than previously anticipated.

== Example systems ==
=== Collemopsidium species ===
The genus Collemopsidium (family Xanthopyreniaceae) comprises marine borderline lichens that typically associate with filamentous cyanobacteria of the genus Hyella. Rocky seashores are the primary habitat: species in this genus inhabit the midlittoral to supralittoral zones and frequently grow as endoliths, boring into calcareous rocks or the shells of marine organisms. Their thalli are often entirely immersed within the substrate, with only the carbonised, black perithecia visible as minute dots on rock or shell surfaces.

A 2016 study using two molecular markers (nrLSU and mtSSU) and the general mixed Yule–coalescent model (GMYC) established that the global diversity of marine Collemopsidium is far greater than previously recognized: approximately 26 putative species were inferred worldwide, compared with six morphological species recognized previously in Europe. Bayes factor comparison strongly supported the higher-diversity model. The study also found that rock-boring ability has been acquired and lost multiple times throughout the evolutionary history of the group, indicating that this trait evolved in parallel in different lineages within Collemopsidiales. The maritime borderline lichen Collemopsidium pelvetiae, which grows on the brown seaweed Pelvetia canaliculata, was also treated by Kohlmeyer and co-authors as a borderline lichen example.

=== Hortaea werneckii and Dunaliella atacamensis ===
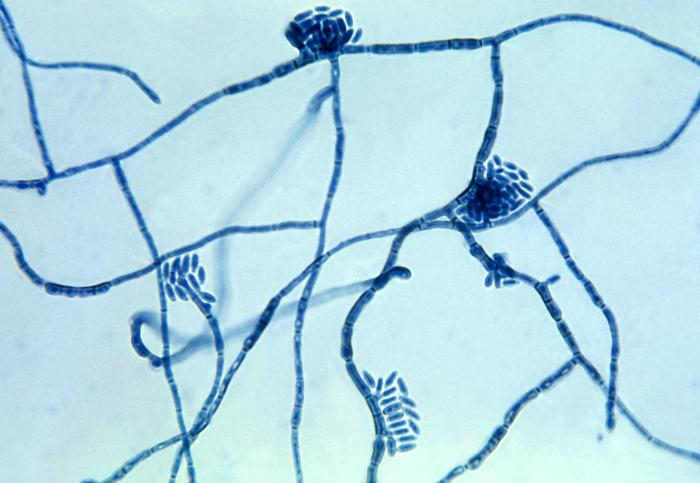
Microscopic view of the halotolerant black yeast Hortaea werneckii, one of the partners proposed for a borderline lichen-like association with the microalga Dunaliella atacamensis in Atacama Desert caves

In a cave on the Coastal Range of the Atacama Desert in Chile, the extremely halotolerant black yeast Hortaea werneckii has been found growing among colonies of the microalga Dunaliella atacamensis in an association reminiscent of borderline lichens. D. atacamensis is the only member of the genus Dunaliella reported from a subaerial habitat, where it persists as non-motile colonies surrounded by a gelatinous matrix (a palmella stage) with thickened cell walls. The cave is inhabited by spiders whose silk threads collect condensing fog, supporting the growth of adhering algal colonies among which melanised cells of H. werneckii are frequently observed. Co-cultivation experiments using different growth media and cultivation approaches (including solid and liquid media, alginate inclusions, and dialysis membranes) have failed to show clear mutual effects between the two species in a laboratory setting. D. atacamensis could not be grown in vitro despite repeated attempts, and on solid media H. werneckii grew mostly in its yeast form, with melanised cells detected as dark spots within the algal colonies. The authors discussed this negative experimental outcome in the context of how fungal–algal interactions might transition from loose contact to stable, structured lichen symbioses, noting that the association may still be in a very early evolutionary stage and that more stressful conditions might be needed to trigger lichenization.

=== Mastodia tessellata and Prasiola ===
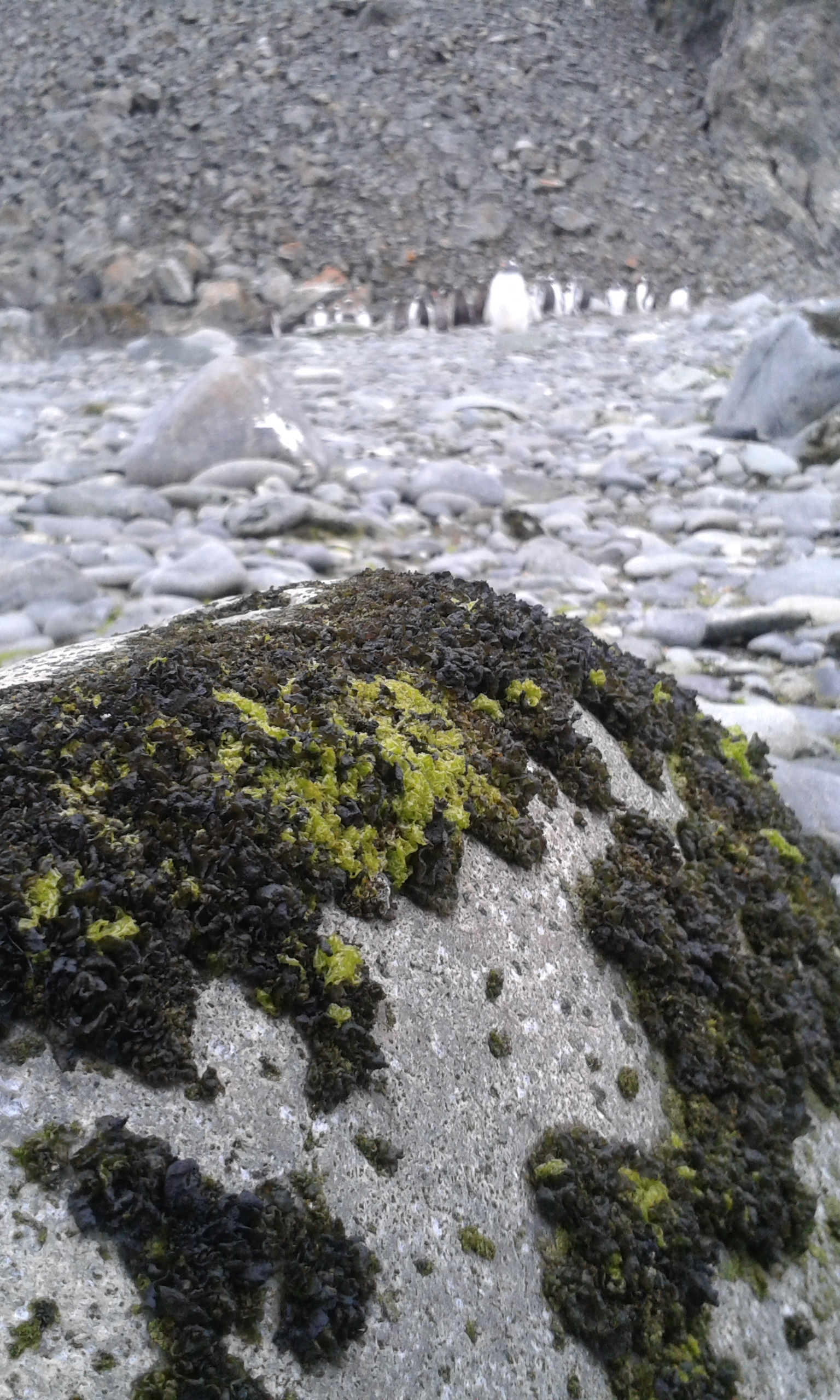
Coastal rock covered with dark colonies of Mastodia tessellata at the shoreline; penguins stand on the beach in the background

The relationship between the ascomycete Mastodia tessellata (a member of the Verrucariaceae, a family consisting mainly of lichen-forming fungi in terrestrial and intertidal habitats) and the foliose green alga Prasiola is one of the most widely studied borderline systems. Found in maritime polar regions such as the Antarctic Peninsula, the association was variously classified as a mycophycobiosis or fungal infestation because the fungal partner lives within the algal tissue, complicating the distinction between exhabitant and inhabitant. Kohlmeyer and co-authors reported that the mycelium forms a dense network of interwoven hyphae around algal cells without a differentiated cortex layer and noted the absence of secondary lichen substances.

Independent developmental studies by Lud and co-authors and by Kováčik and Pereira concluded that, despite its simple organizational level, the association qualifies as a lichen because the fungus decisively alters the arrangement of the algal cells, which become separated by gelatinised hyphae. The photobiont provides carbon to the fungus, while the symbiosis increases the alga's tolerance of freezing temperatures. Using multilocus sequence data (nrITS, RPL10A, and the plastid gene tufA) and species delimitation analyses, Garrido-Benavent and co-authors proposed that Mastodia tessellata associates with at least two species of Prasiola across its bipolar range, including P. borealis and an undescribed lineage restricted to the Antarctic Peninsula.

=== Schizoxylon albescens and optional lichenization ===
Schizoxylon albescens (family Stictidaceae) is a boreal ascomycete that exemplifies optional lichenization. On bark of Populus tremula (aspen), the fungus forms a borderline lichen morph: white patches containing minute fruiting bodies approximately 0.5–1 mm across, surrounded by clumps of the green alga Coccomyxa. On dead aspen wood, the same species occurs as a saprotrophic morph, producing slightly larger fruiting bodies (approximately 1–2 mm) without lichenized patches. Using high-throughput sequencing of the bacterial 16S rRNA gene together with fluorescence in situ hybridisation, Fernández-Brime and co-authors reported that bacterial communities differed between the two morphs but were determined chiefly by substrate (bark versus wood) rather than by the presence of algal photobionts. They concluded that the simple organization of borderline lichenization in Schizoxylon lacks the complex thallus structure required to host the highly specific microbiota typical of advanced lichens.

=== Trizodia acrobia ===
Trizodia acrobia is a microscopic ascomycete that forms a tripartite association with cyanobacterial colonies (mostly Nostoc) and peat mosses, and has been described as a borderline lichen. The fungus produces translucent white to cream-coloured apothecia up to 0.24 mm in diameter on the basal leaves of apical Sphagnum branches, specifically where dark green spots of Nostoc occur on the moss heads. Its hyphae are extracellular on living Sphagnum cells but enter the water-filled, dead hyaline cells through cell pores to envelop cyanobacterial colonies both on the moss surface and inside the leaf, without forming an organized thallus. Stenroos and co-authors found the fungus in all 44 Sphagnum–Nostoc associations they examined, but never in Sphagnum populations where cyanobacteria were absent, suggesting obligate cyanotrophy combined with specificity to the moss substrate.

In a five-gene phylogenetic analysis of symbioses between ascomycetes and bryophytes, Stenroos and co-authors placed Trizodia as basal to the Leotiomycetes, representing a previously unrecognized lineage within the Ascomycota. The authors described the association as potentially a structurally undeveloped form of a bryosymbiotic cyanolichen, noting that it does not form organized thallus structures but shares several characteristics with lichens, including apparent dependence on its photobiont and a hemiamyloid ascus wall.

== Symbiotic function and the mutualism debate ==
The nature of the interaction in borderline lichens is central to broader debates about whether the lichen symbiosis should be viewed as a mutualism or as a more one-sided relationship. Because borderline associations lack the complex protective structures of macrolichens, the costs and benefits of the relationship are sometimes considered more readily observable.

=== Carbon transfer ===
A hallmark of lichenization is the mass transfer of photosynthetically fixed carbohydrates from the photobiont to the mycobiont. In eukaryotic algal lichens, this transfer involves sugar alcohols (ribitol, erythritol, or sorbitol, depending on the genus), whereas cyanobionts transfer glucose; the mycobionts convert the sugars received into mannitol and arabitol. Sanders noted that these carbon transfer systems show remarkable convergences across independently evolved lichen lineages, and that when a compatible fungus is encountered, the alga proactively releases large amounts of carbohydrate in response to symbiotic signalling, a process that ceases when the alga is isolated into culture. This active release, rather than forcible extraction, suggests that the alga is a participant in the partnership rather than a passive victim. Whether the same transfer mechanisms operate in borderline lichens, where contact between partners is less intimate, has not been directly tested.

=== Benefits and protections ===
Borderline lichens provide evidence of environmental protection for the photobiont in stressful microhabitats. In the Mastodia–Prasiola system, the alga's tolerance of freezing is enhanced in symbiosis. In maritime environments, the rock-boring mycelia of borderline lichens provide a stable, moisture-retaining refuge for cyanobacteria that might otherwise be desiccated or washed away. More generally, Sanders argued that lichen-forming fungi conserve rather than consume their algal symbionts, and that in the stressful environments where lichens are successful, the mutual self-interests of both partners substantially align.

=== Parasitic interpretations ===
Despite these observations, some prominent biologists have questioned whether the algal partner truly benefits. Vernon Ahmadjian, for example, characterized the relationship as "controlled parasitism" rather than mutualism, while others point to the proactive release of carbohydrates by the algae as evidence of a cooperative partnership. Borderline lichens are often cited in this debate because their lack of complex structure makes the immediate costs and benefits to each partner easier to observe than in macrolichens. In some borderline cases, the dynamics between partners can appear antagonistic. In the leaf-dwelling Strigula, Ward (1884) observed that if the mycelium encounters a germinating spore or few-celled germling of its algal partner Cephaleuros, the alga is overpowered and destroyed. Ward further suggested that a stable equilibrium can be established only when the fungus contacts a well-established alga. Sanders argued, however, that the proactive release of carbohydrate by the alga, the generally healthy appearance of algal cells within lichen thalli, and the substantial alignment of both partners' long-term interests under stressful conditions are not easily reconciled with a purely parasitic interpretation.

=== Microbiota ===
Because borderline lichens lack much of the differentiated thallus structure that in typical lichens forms a long-lived microhabitat, they have been examined to test how morphological organization relates to associated microbiota. In the Schizoxylon system, bacterial communities in lichenized and saprotrophic morphs were found to be distinct but determined chiefly by substrate rather than by the algal photobiont, suggesting that a more complex thallus is required for hosting specific microbial communities. Grube and Wedin noted that the recognition of additional microbial associates in lichen thalli, including bacteria and yeasts, has complicated traditional two-partner views of the symbiosis and contributed to renewed debate over lichen delimitation.

== Research approaches ==
Research on borderline lichens draws on microscopy, molecular phylogenetics, and culture-based experiments, often in combination. Light microscopy is widely used for describing ascoma anatomy, and Kohlmeyer and co-authors used line drawings to document and clarify the nomenclature of Mastodia and Collemopsidium. Because many borderline lichens are immersed within their substrates, specialized imaging is often required. Pérez-Ortega and co-authors used scanning electron microscopy in backscattered electron mode (SEM-BSE) to explore fine-scale interactions between endolithic fungi and calcareous shells, while Fernández-Brime and co-authors applied fluorescence in situ hybridisation combined with confocal laser scanning microscopy (FISH-CLSM) to localize bacterial communities within the loose mycelia of the Schizoxylon system.

Molecular phylogenetics and species delimitation methods have revealed hidden diversity within borderline lichen groups. Pérez-Ortega and co-authors combined multi-locus phylogenetic analyses with GMYC-based species delimitation to resolve lineages within Collemopsidiales, while Garrido-Benavent and co-authors applied multilocus sequence analyses to explore species boundaries among the Prasiola photobionts associated with Mastodia tessellata. Culture-based experiments complement these molecular approaches. Muggia and co-authors conducted co-cultivation trials with Hortaea werneckii and Dunaliella under multiple media and cultivation conditions to test whether the two organisms would develop lichen-like organization when grown together.
