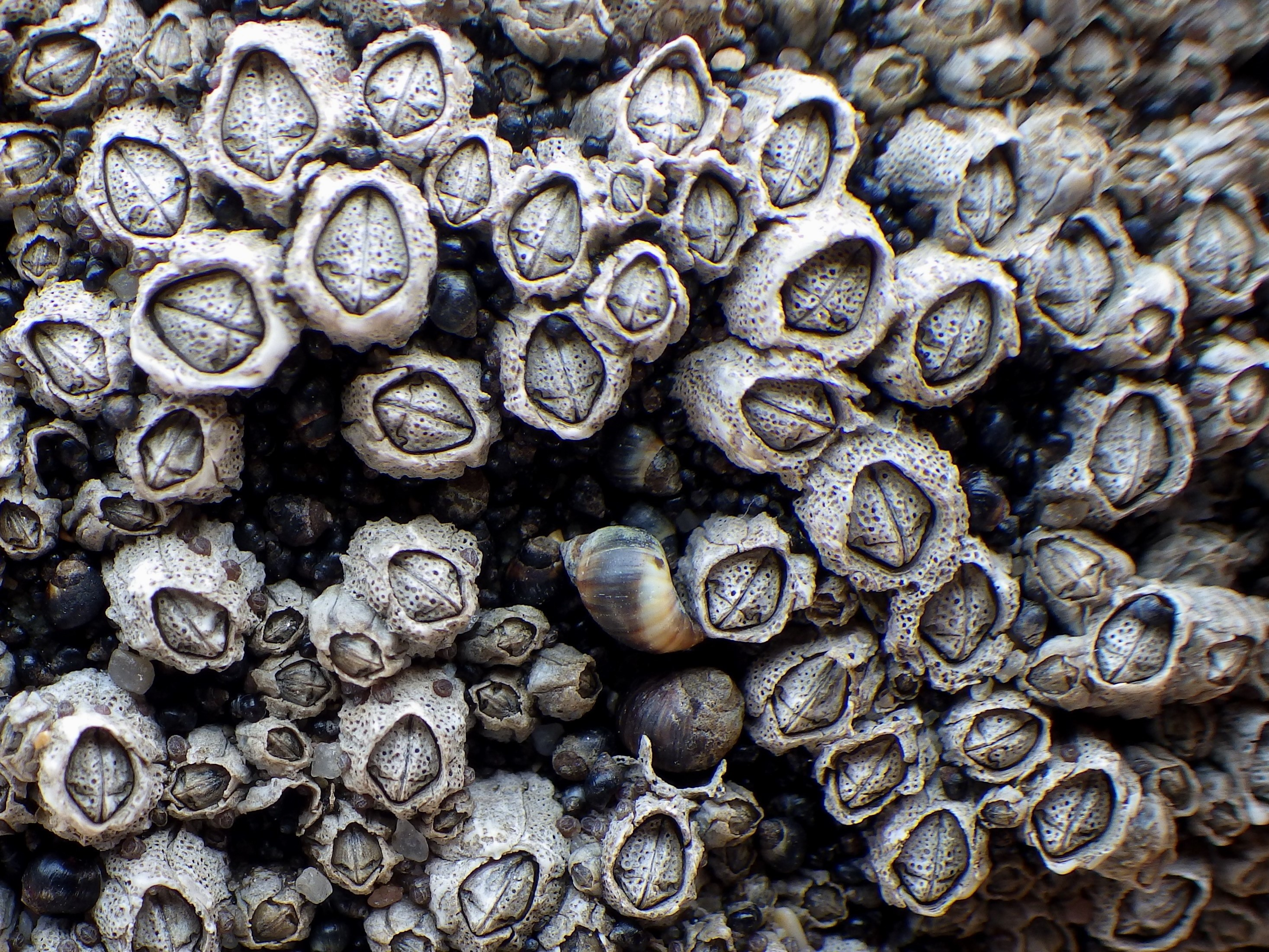
- Collemopsidium foveolatum growing as small black dots on barnacle shells in Lourinhã, Portugal. This marine lichen typically grows embedded within calcareous substrates in the intertidal zone.

Scientific classification
- Kingdom: Fungi
- Division: Ascomycota
- Class: Dothideomycetes
- Order: Collemopsidiales
- Family: Xanthopyreniaceae
- Genus: Collemopsidium
- Species: C. foveolatum

Binomial name
- Collemopsidium foveolatum (A.L.Sm.) F.Mohr (2004)

Synonyms
- Arthopyrenia foveolata A.L.Sm. (1911); Thelidium litorale f. foveolatum (A.L.Sm.) Keissl. (1937); Arthopyrenia sublitoralis f. foveolata (A.L.Sm.) H.Magn. (1950)

= Collemopsidium foveolatum =

Species of lichen

Collemopsidium foveolatum is a species of lichen in the family Xanthopyreniaceae. It is a marine lichen that grows entirely embedded within calcareous substrates in the intertidal zone, particularly on limestone rocks and marine shells. The species is characterised by its minute, black, sunken reproductive structures (perithecia) that measure 0.10–0.24 mm in diameter and create small pits in the substrate. First described in 1911 from specimens collected in England, it has since been documented along coastlines in western Europe, North America and North Africa. The species can be distinguished from similar marine lichens by its consistently small, deeply embedded perithecia and its ability to maintain stable growth by keeping pace with natural substrate erosion.

== Taxonomy ==
Collemopsidium foveolatum was first described as Arthopyrenia foveolata by Annie Lorrain Smith in 1911. In her original description, Smith characterised it as having minute, black, sunken perithecia (fruiting bodies) that created small pits in the substrate, distinguishing it from Arthopyrenia litoralis (another shell-dwelling species) by its smaller perithecia and their immersed growth pattern. The type specimen was collected by Edward Morell Holmes from shells washed up on the shore at Robin Hood's Bay, North Yorkshire.

The taxon was transferred to the genus Collemopsidium by Fiona Mohr in 2004 based on molecular and morphological evidence. The genus Collemopsidium was originally placed in the order Dothideales but was later moved to the family Xanthopyreniaceae, in the order Collemopsidiales.

The species was historically difficult to distinguish from other marine Collemopsidium species, particularly C. sublitorale, leading to some taxonomic confusion. Molecular studies in the early 2000s helped clarify its status as a distinct species.

== Description ==
Collemopsidium foveolatum is a marine lichen that grows entirely embedded within its substrate. Its main body (thallus) is so deeply immersed that it is not visible on the surface. The species produces small reproductive structures called perithecia, which measure 0.10–0.24 mm in diameter and are also typically embedded in small pits within the substrate. Each perithecium is covered by a black, protective cap (involucrellum) that appears "lid-like" and lies either flat or slightly convex against the surface, with minimal lateral spread.

The lichen reproduces through spores (ascospores) that measure 14–21 by 5–9 micrometres. It also commonly produces asexual reproductive structures called pycnidia, which appear as small black spots embedded in the substrate. Sometimes specimens may lack the characteristic black protective covering over their perithecia, representing a natural variation within the species.

Collemopsidium foveolatum can be distinguished from similar species, particularly C. sublitorale, by its consistently smaller perithecia that remain deeply embedded in the substrate rather than protruding. While C. sublitorale often shows variation in perithecial size within a single specimen, C. foveolatum typically maintains consistent perithecial sizes throughout each individual.

The lichen contains a photosynthetic partner (photobiont) that appears in scattered groups within the thallus, though in some specimens it may be absent. No secondary metabolites (lichen products) have been identified in this species.

== Habitat and distribution ==
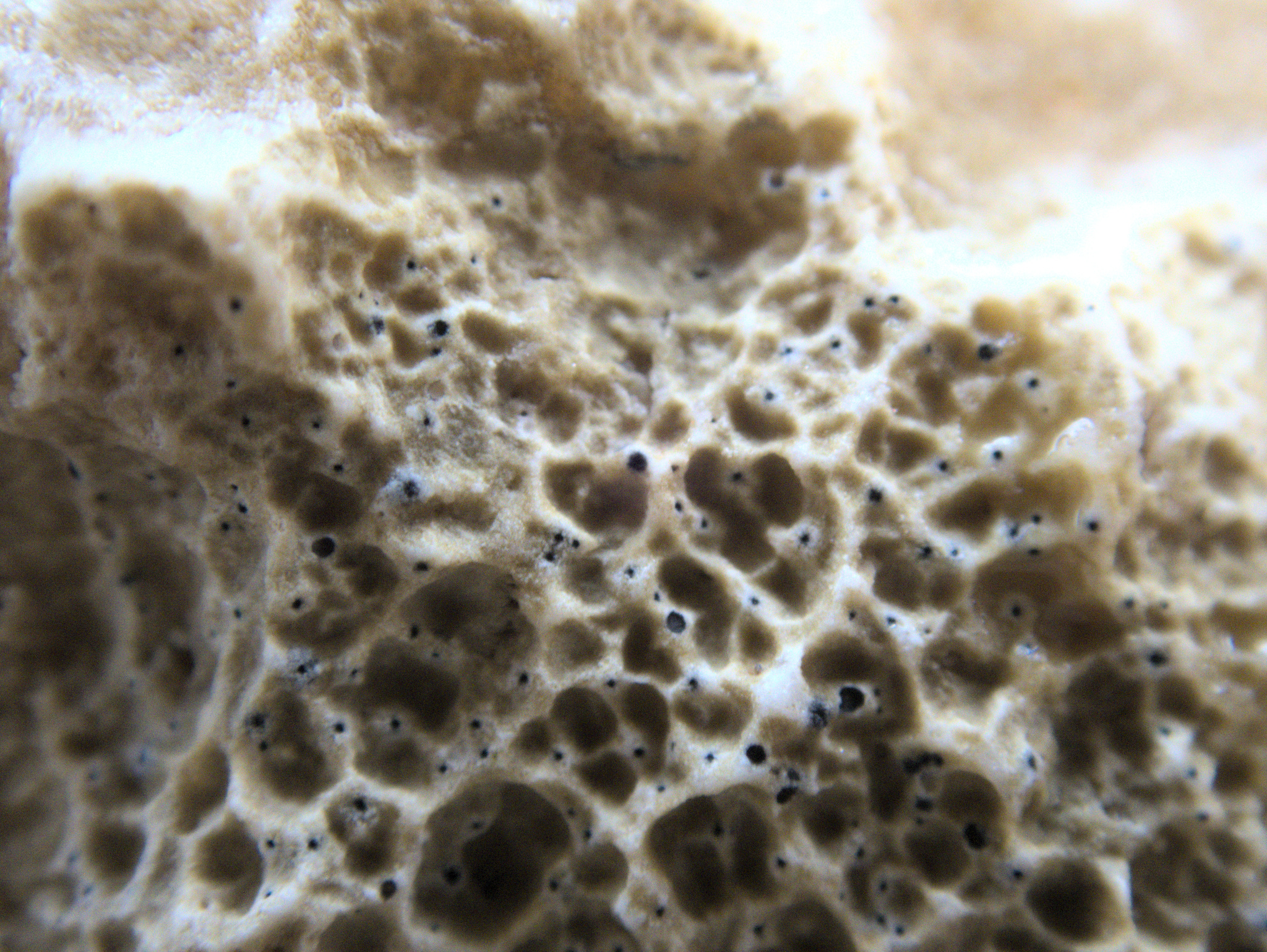
Close-up view of Collemopsidium foveolatum growing on a shell substrate, showing its characteristic tiny black perithecia embedded in small pits. The species name foveolatum refers to these pit-like depressions in which the reproductive structures are immersed.

Collemopsidium foveolatum is a marine lichen that grows in the intertidal zone, specifically in the eulittoral zone (the area between high and low tides) and the littoral fringe (the area just above high tide). It shows a strong preference for calcareous substrates, growing primarily on limestone rocks and the shells of marine organisms. Research has confirmed the distinctive zonation patterns of marine lichens like C. foveolatum in the eulittoral zone, demonstrating that these species possess specific traits adapted to regular seawater immersion, including higher proportions of cyanobacterial photobionts and perithecioid fruiting bodies.

The species has been documented along the coasts of western Europe, with confirmed populations in Ireland, Norway, and the United Kingdom. Environmental studies suggest it tends to be more common on shores with northerly aspects, though this observation may be influenced by sampling bias. Compared to other marine Collemopsidium species, C. foveolatum appears better adapted to drier conditions and can be found higher up on the shore than some of its relatives.

When growing on limestone shores, C. foveolatum maintains its ability to grow by keeping pace with natural erosion of the substrate through its characteristic embedded growth pattern. The species can often be found growing alongside other marine Collemopsidium species, particularly on shell substrates, indicating that multiple species can occupy similar ecological niches in the marine environment.

The lichen has also been documented from Alaska (USA), British Columbia (Canada), and Morocco.
