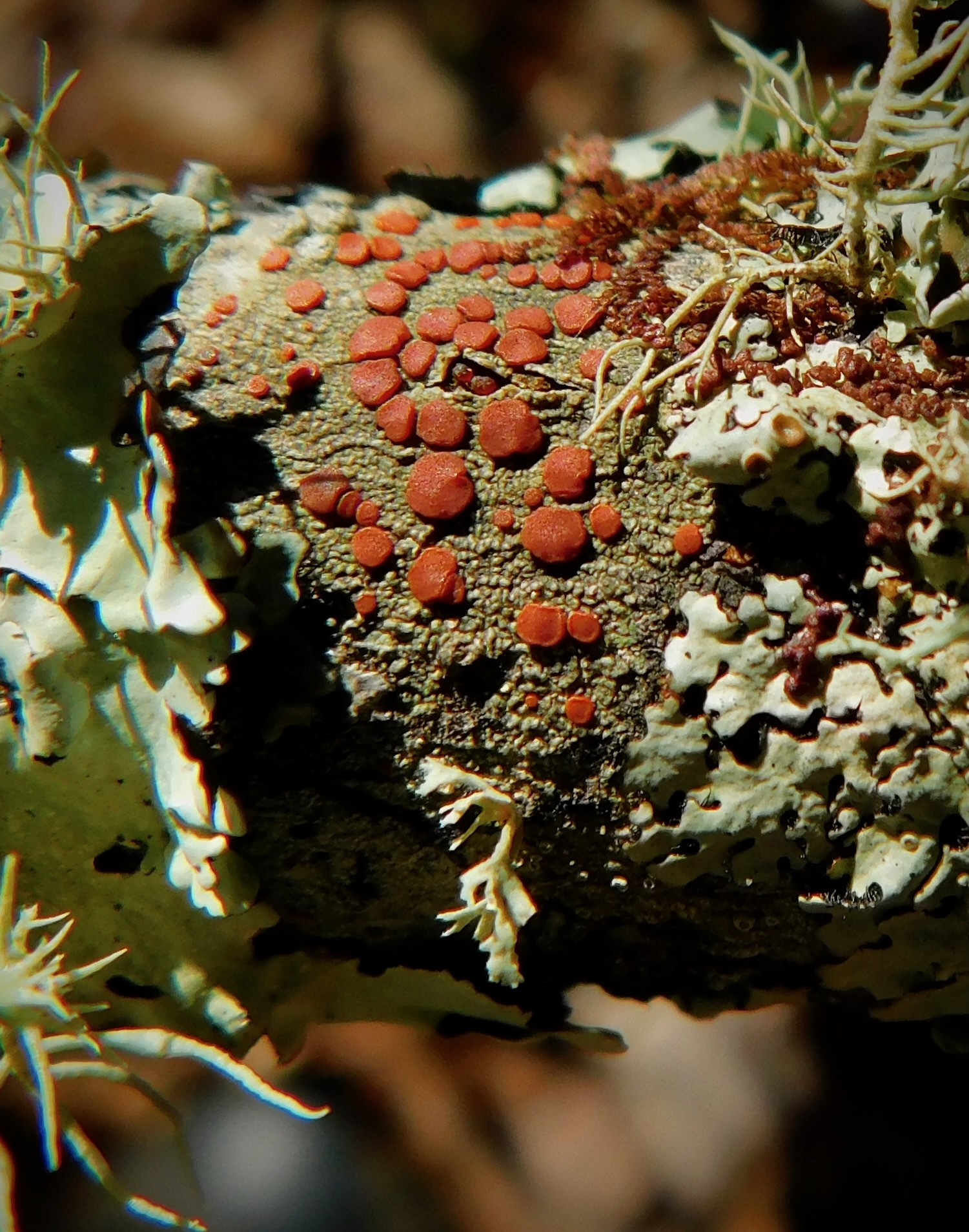

Conservation status
- Apparently Secure (NatureServe)

Scientific classification
- Kingdom: Fungi
- Division: Ascomycota
- Class: Lecanoromycetes
- Order: Lecanorales
- Family: Ramalinaceae
- Genus: Bacidia
- Species: B. rubella

Binomial name
- Bacidia rubella (Hoffm.) A.Massal. (1852)

Synonyms
- List: Bacidia luteola (Schrad.) Mudd; Bacidia luteola f. adversa (Nyl.) Zahlbr., 1927; Bacidia luteola f. conspondens (Nyl.) Zahlbr., 1927; Bacidia luteola f. endoleucotera (Nyl.) Zahlbr., 1927; Bacidia luteola f. porriginosa (Turner) Oxner; Bacidia luteola var. porriginosa (Turner) A.L.Sm.; Bacidia luteola var. rubella (Hoffm.) Boistel; Bacidia porriginosa (Turner) Th.Fr.; Bacidia rubella f. porriginosa (Turner) Arnold; Bacidia rubella var. luteola (Schrad.) Th.Fr.; Bacidia rubella var. porriginosa (Turner) H.Olivier; Bacidia rubella var. porriginosa (Turner) Th.Fr.; Biatora luteola (Schrad.) Fr.; Biatora rubella (Hoffm.) Rabenh.; Biatora vernalis var. luteola (Schrad.) Fr.; Bilimbia luteola (Schrad.) Anon.; Lecidea granulosa var. porriginosa (Turner) Clemente; Lecidea luteola (Schrad.) Ach.; Lecidea luteola var. porriginosa (Turner) Ach.; Lecidea vernalis var. luteola (Schrad.) Link; Lichen corticalis Rutstr.; Lichen luteolus Schrad.; Lichen lutereus J.F.Gmel.; Lichen porriginosus Turner; Lichen rubellus Ehrh.; Ochrolechia luteola (Schrad.) Overeem; Patellaria luteola var. porriginosa (Turner) Müll.Arg.; Patellaria rubella (Hoffm.) DC.; Patellaria rubella subsp. luteolus (Schrad.) Mérat; Patellaria rubella subsp. rubellus (Hoffm.) Mérat; Secoliga rubella (Hoffm.) Stizenb.; Secoliga rubella f. porriginosa (Turner) Stizenb.; Verrucaria rubella Hoffm.

= Bacidia rubella =

Species of lichen-forming fungus

Bacidia rubella is a species of corticolous (bark-dwelling), crustose lichen in the family Ramalinaceae. First described in 1796, it features a grey to yellow-green thallus with small granular structures covering its surface. When present, its distinctive fruiting bodies (apothecia) range from pale to dark red-brown in colour, measuring up to 1 mm in diameter. The species occurs widely throughout Britain and Ireland and is also broadly distributed across lowland central and northern Europe, typically inhabiting nutrient-rich bark of mature trees such as maple, ash, and elm in parklands, roadsides, and fertile woodlands. It generally avoids heavily polluted areas and favours continental, montane habitats in the Mediterranean region. It is known to host several species of fungi that specifically colonise lichens.

== Taxonomy ==
Bacidia rubella was originally described as a new species in 1796 by the German lichenologist Georg Franz Hoffmann, who classified it as a species of Verrucaria. Abramo Bartolommeo Massalongo reclassified it in Bacidia in 1852.

Bacidia rubella belongs to a group of closely related lichens known as the Bacidia rubella group. Species within this group are generally characterised by their orange to red-brown apothecia, which contain Rubella-orange pigment primarily located in the subhymenium and hypothecium. Unlike other groups within the genus Bacidia, the exciple (the outer rim of the apothecium) of the Bacidia rubella group is composed of moderately gelatinised, branching hyphae, often containing clusters of crystals. These crystals vary among species, particularly in their distribution and solubility in chemical tests. Additionally, the pigmentation in the hymenium is faint and diffused, with no distinctly coloured epithecium present.

Other members of the Bacidia rubella group include B. fraxinea, B. rosella, B. parathalassica, B. iberica, and the Mediterranean species B. thyrrenica. These species are differentiated based on subtle anatomical traits such as the arrangement and chemical solubility of crystals within their apothecia, as well as differences in ascospore size and septation.

== Description ==
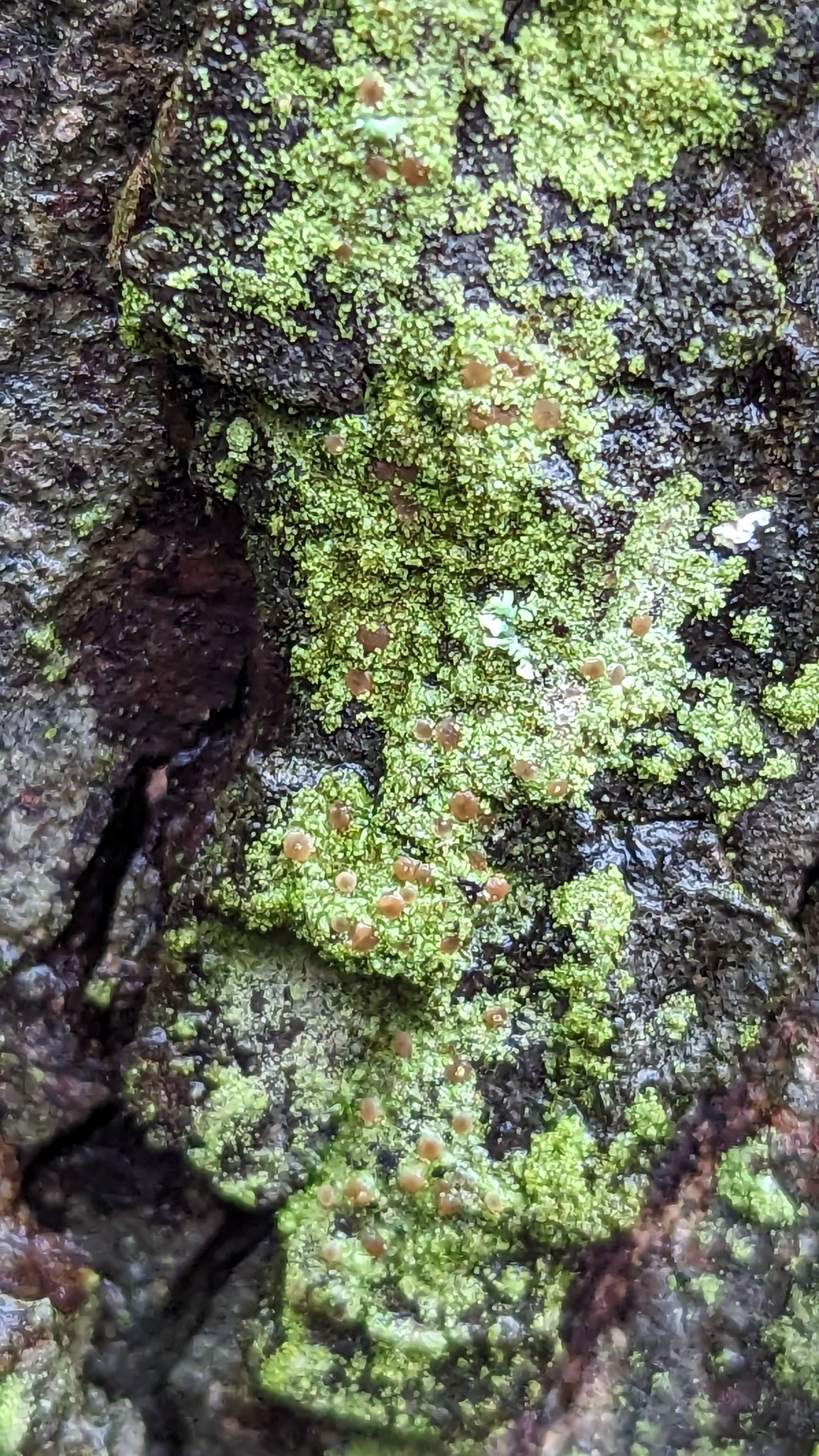
The thallus has a granular-isidiate texture.

Bacidia rubella is characterized by a thallus (the main body of the lichen) that ranges in colour from grey to yellow-green. The thallus has a distinctive texture that varies from thinly to richly granular-isidiate, meaning it is covered with small granular structures (isidia) that measure 60–120 μm in diameter. The photobiont cells (the photosynthetic algal partner in the lichen symbiosis) are 5–17 μm in diameter.

Apothecia (fruiting bodies) are often absent in this species. When present, they typically measure 0.7–1 mm in diameter and are usually distinctly constricted at the base. These apothecia are flat, sometimes becoming convex, and range in colour from pale to dark red-brown. The margin of the apothecia is sometimes covered with a white, powdery coating (pruinose). The true exciple (the rim or margin of the apothecium) is colourless in its lower part, while the upper part is pale yellow-orange or yellow-straw coloured. In pruinose specimens, the exciple sometimes displays radiating streaks of minute crystals. The exciple is composed of hyphae (fungal filaments) with internal spaces (lumina) measuring 1–2 μm in diameter, or up to 5 μm in diameter toward the outer edge.

The hymenium (the spore-producing layer) is 70–105 μm high and is either colourless or faintly orange-red or yellow in its upper part. The hypothecium (the tissue beneath the hymenium) is colourless, or pale yellow or orange-straw coloured in its upper part, and may intensify to yellow when treated with potassium hydroxide solution (K). The paraphyses (sterile filaments among the spore sacs) are 1–1.5 μm in diameter, either unbranched or forked in their upper portion, with their tips often slightly swollen to about 2.5 μm in diameter. The ascospores (fungal spores produced in asci) typically measure 40–70 by 2.5–3 μm and are acicular (needle-shaped) with 3 to 7 (occasionally up to 13) septa (cross walls). The pycnidia (asexual reproductive structures) are 85–125 μm in diameter and range in colour from pale pink to red-brown. The conidia (asexual spores) measure 16–24 by about 0.5 μm and are curved or S-shaped (sigmoid).

== Habitat and distribution ==
In the United Kingdom, Bacidia rubella occurs mainly on the bark of mature trees, particularly those with nutrient-rich surfaces such as maple Acer, ash (Fraxinus), and elm (Ulmus). It is typically found in parklands, along roadsides, and within woodlands growing on fertile soils. On rare occasions, it may also inhabit sheltered gravestones or walls. This species is widespread throughout Britain and Ireland but becomes less common in western Scotland and is absent from areas affected by pollution.

Bacidia rubella is broadly distributed beyond the United Kingdom, occurring across much of lowland central and northern Europe. Within the Mediterranean region, it typically occupies montane areas with climates that are more continental compared to coastal or lowland species within the group. Its ecological preference is nitrophilous, favouring habitats enriched by nutrients. This ecological adaptability enables Bacidia rubella to grow in a variety of continental environments, although it generally avoids heavily polluted areas. In Nepal, Bacidia rubella has been reported at 300 m elevation in a compilation of published records.

== Species interactions ==
Bacidia rubella is a host species of the lichenicolous (lichen-dwelling) fungus species Muellerella hospitans, Sporidesmium bacidiicola, and Zwackhiomyces polischukii.
