= Didymellopsis =

Scientific classification
- Kingdom: Fungi
- Division: Ascomycota
- Class: Dothideomycetes
- Order: Collemopsidiales
- Family: Xanthopyreniaceae
- Genus: Didymellopsis (Sacc. & D.Sacc.) Clem. & Shear

Type species
- Didymellopsis latitans (Nyl.) Sacc. ex Clem. & Shear

Synonyms
- Didymella subgen. Didymellopsis Sacc. & D.Sacc. (1905)

Genus of fungi

Didymellopsis is a genus of lichenicolous (lichen-dwelling) fungi in the family Xanthopyreniaceae.

== Species ==
As of January 2025, Species Fungorum (in the Catalogue of Life) accepts seven species of Didymellopsis.

- Didymellopsis collemata (J.Steiner) Grube & Hafellner (1990) – host: Collema
- Didymellopsis latitans (Nyl.) Sacc. ex Clem. & Shear (1931) – host: Lichinella and Lempholemma
- Didymellopsis nephromatis Zhurb. & Etayo (2015) – host: Nephroma cellulosum
- Didymellopsis perigena (Nyl.) Grube & Hafellner (1990) – host: Placidium squamulosum
- Didymellopsis pulposi (Zopf) Grube & Hafellner (1990) – host: Collema, Enchylium, Lathagrium, Lempholemma, and Scytinium
- Didymellopsis solorinae Zhurb. (2021)
- Didymellopsis viridireagens Etayo (2017) – host: Leptogium
