= 60S ribosomal protein L10a =

Protein found in humans

RPL10A

Identifiers
- Aliases: RPL10A, CSA19, Csa-19, L10A, NEDD6, ribosomal protein L10a, uL1
- External IDs: OMIM: 615660; MGI: 1343877; GeneCards: RPL10A
Available structures
PDB	Ortholog search: PDBe RCSB
PDB	List of PDB id codes 4UG0, 4V6X, 5AJ0, 3J7R

Gene location (Human)
Chr.	Chromosome 6 (human)
Band	6p21.31	Start	35,468,401 bp
Band	6p21.31	End	35,470,785 bp

Gene location (Mouse)
Chr.	Chromosome 17 (mouse)
Band	17|17 A3.3	Start	28,547,445 bp
Band	17|17 A3.3	End	28,550,007 bp
RNA expression pattern
Bgee	Human / Mouse (ortholog); Top expressed in: right uterine tube; left ovary; right ovary; canal of the cervix; body of uterus; smooth muscle tissue; skin of abdomen; left uterine tube; skin of leg; ganglionic eminence / Top expressed in: genital tubercle; tail of embryo; epiblast; urinary bladder; spleen; thymus; embryo; ovary; embryo; uterus; More reference expression data
BioGPS	n/a
Gene ontology
Molecular function	structural constituent of ribosome; protein binding; RNA binding
Cellular component	cytosol; ribosome; membrane; focal adhesion; large ribosomal subunit; extracellular exosome; nucleus; cytosolic large ribosomal subunit; postsynaptic density; polysomal ribosome
Biological process	viral transcription; SRP-dependent cotranslational protein targeting to membrane; translational initiation; nuclear-transcribed mRNA catabolic process, nonsense-mediated decay; maturation of LSU-rRNA; protein biosynthesis; rRNA processing; response to ethanol; cytoplasmic translation
Sources:Amigo / QuickGO
Orthologs
Databases	NCBI: entry; OMA: entry
Species	Human	Mouse
Entrez	4736	19896
Ensembl	ENSG00000198755	ENSMUSG00000037805
UniProt	P62906	P53026
RefSeq (mRNA)	NM_007104	NM_011287; NM_001357628
RefSeq (protein)	NP_009035	n/a
Location (UCSC)	Chr 6: 35.47 – 35.47 Mb	Chr 17: 28.55 – 28.55 Mb
PubMed search
- Wikidata
View/Edit Human	View/Edit Mouse

60S ribosomal protein L10a is a protein that in humans is encoded by the RPL10A gene.

Ribosomes, the organelles that catalyze protein synthesis, consist of a small 40S subunit and a large 60S subunit. Together these subunits are composed of 4 RNA species and approximately 80 structurally distinct proteins. This gene encodes a ribosomal protein that is a component of the 60S subunit. The protein belongs to the L1P family of ribosomal proteins. It is located in the cytoplasm. The expression of this gene is downregulated in the thymus by cyclosporin-A (CsA), an immunosuppressive drug. Studies in mice have shown that the expression of the ribosomal protein L10a gene is downregulated in neural precursor cells during development. This gene used to be referred to as NEDD6 (neural precursor cell expressed, developmentally downregulated 6), but it has been renamed RPL10A (ribosomal protein 10a). As is typical for genes encoding ribosomal proteins, there are multiple processed pseudogenes of this gene dispersed through the genome.
