= Maria Makarevych =

Soviet botanist and lichenologist (1906-1989)

- Born: 4 December 1906; Moshny, Cherkasy Raion, Cherkasy Oblast (now Ukraine)
- Died: 24 February 1989 (aged 82); Kyiv
- Education: Kyiv Institute of Public Education
- Known for: Studying lichens of the Carpathian region
- Scientific career
- Fields: Botany, lichenology
- Workplaces: Ukrainian Research Institute of Peat Industry, Research Institute of Agro-Soil Science and Agricultural Chemistry
- Author abbrev. (botany): Makar.

Maria Florianivna Makarevych (1906–1989) was a Soviet botanist and lichenologist noted for studying lichens of the Carpathian region, and for publishing multiple influential monographs. The genus Marfloraea is named in her honor. The standard author abbreviation Makar. is used to indicate this person as the author when citing a botanical name.

== Biography ==
Maria Makarevich was born on 4 December 1906 in the village of Moshny, Cherkasy Raion, Cherkasy Oblast (now Ukraine). Her father was zemstvo doctor Florian Feliksovich Makarevych, her mother, Maria Tychinin, was a daughter of a merchant. In 1921, she graduated from a labor school in Cherkasy, in 1925 from an agricultural vocational school and in 1926 she entered the Kyiv Institute of Public Education. In 1932, she started working at the Ukrainian Research Institute of Peat Industry. In 1934, she became an employee of the Research Institute of Agro-Soil Science and Agricultural Chemistry. In 1946, Makarevych get the degree of Candidate of Biological Sciences. In 1964, she became a doctor of biological sciences and moved to the position of a senior researcher in the department of spore plants.

She was married and had two sons. She died in Kyiv on 24 February 1989.
