= Muellerella hospitans =

Scientific classification
- Domain: Eukaryota
- Kingdom: Fungi
- Division: Ascomycota
- Class: Eurotiomycetes
- Order: Verrucariales
- Family: Verrucariaceae
- Genus: Muellerella
- Species: M. hospitans

Binomial name
- Muellerella hospitans Stizenb. (1863)

Synonyms
- Muellerella polyspora var. hospitans (Stizenb.) Keissl.; Muellerella polyspora var. microspora Ferr.

Species of fungus

Muellerella hospitans is a species of lichenicolous fungus in the family Verrucariaceae. It is known to infect the lichen Bacidia rubella.
