= Camille Flagey =

French lichenologist (1837–1898)

Camille Flagey (1837–1898) was a French lichenologist who studied lichens in Algeria.

Flagey edited two exsiccatae, namely Lichens de Franche-Comté et de quelques localités environnantes, publiés par C. Flagey, ingenieur civil (1882-1888) and Lichenes Algerienses exsiccati (1891-1895).
