= Magmopsis =

Scientific classification
- Kingdom: Fungi
- Division: Ascomycota
- Class: incertae sedis
- Order: incertae sedis
- Family: incertae sedis
- Genus: Magmopsis; Nyl. (1875)

Type species
- Magmopsis pertenella Nyl. (1875)

Species
- M. argilospila M. pertenella

Genus of lichens

Magmopsis is a small genus of lichen-forming ascomycete fungi of uncertain classification. It comprises little-known two species of crustose lichens. The genus was established in 1875 by the Finnish lichenologist William Nylander based on specimens collected from calcareous rocks in Finland. Its taxonomic placement has remained uncertain for 150 years due to the lack of modern specimens and DNA data.

== Taxonomy ==
The genus was circumscribed by the Finnish lichenologist William Nylander in 1875. Nylander erected Magmopsis to accommodate a small, sooty-grey crustose lichen, Magmopsis pertenella. This lichen had immersed, black apothecia that he described as "pyrenio-type conceptacles" (perithecioid ascomata). In sectioning he found the interior of the fruiting bodies white, and noted eight hyaline, ovoid, 1-septate ascospores, measuring about 14–16 μm × 6–7 μm; the paraphyses were slender and sparse to evanescent. The hymenial gel did not stain with iodine (I−), and the ascus contents appeared wine-brown in iodine. The apothecia were tiny (about 0.13–0.14 mm across). Nylander's material came from calcareous rock in the Ladoga region of Finland, collected by Johan Petter Norrlin.

In discussing placement, Nylander treated Magmopsis as allied to the "Phylliscodeae" (his usage) or even warranting a tribe of its own. He remarked that the apothecia seemed peridiate and he could not find a true ostiole, drawing an analogy to Mycoporum within the byssoid lichens of his time. Nevertheless, he considered the taxon difficult to assign to the pyrenocarpous tribes sensu the nineteenth-century systems and kept it with apothecioid lichens rather than among true pyrenocarps.

A second species, Magmopsis argilospila, was added to the genus by Nylander in an 1886 publication of James Crombie's.

In 2013 Kevin Hyde and colleagues, in their work on Dothideomycetes classification, wrote "Magmopsis Nyl. appears to be a synonym of Pyrenopsis in Lichinaceae". As of 2016, there was no molecular data available for Magmopsis.

== See also ==
- List of Ascomycota genera incertae sedis
