= Zwackhiomyces =

Scientific classification
- Domain: Eukaryota
- Kingdom: Fungi
- Division: Ascomycota
- Class: Dothideomycetes
- Order: Collemopsidiales
- Family: Xanthopyreniaceae
- Genus: Zwackhiomyces; Grube & Hafellner (1990)

Type species
- Zwackhiomyces coepulonus (Norman) Grube & R.Sant. (1990)

Synonyms
- Zwackhiomyces Grube & Triebel (1989)

Genus of fungi

Zwackhiomyces is a genus of lichenicolous (lichen-dwelling) fungi in the family Xanthopyreniaceae.

== Taxonomy ==
The genus was circumscribed by Martin Grube and Josef Hafellner in 1990, with Zwackhiomyces coepulonus assigned as the type species. The name Zwackhiomyces honours the German mycologist Philipp Franz Wilhelm von Zwackh-Holzhausen (1826–1903).

Zwackhiomyces was established to accommodate several lichenicolous fungi previously classified within the collective genus Didymella. The establishment of this new genus was based on several distinguishing morphological characteristics, particularly the structure of the peridium, asci, and spores, which set it apart from Didymella and related genera. The genus was placed in the family Arthopyreniaceae within the Dothideales. When first described, the genus included nine species, all of which are parasitic or parasymbiotic on lichens containing green algae as photobionts. Three species were described as new: Z. euplocinus, Z. inconspicuus, and Z. sphinctriniformis. The remaining species were new combinations transferred from other genera:

- Z. berengerianus (from Arthopyrenia)
- Z. coepulonus (from Arthopyrenia)
- Z. dispersus (from Arthopyrenia)
- Z. immersae (from Endococcus)
- Z. martinatianus (from Arthopyrenia)
- Z. sphinctrinoides (from Endococcus)

The genus is distinguished from the related genus Didymellopsis by differences in wall texture, hamathecium structure, spore wall construction, and host selection. While morphologically similar to some other lichenicolous genera like Arthopyrenia, Stigmidium, and Cercidospora, Zwackhiomyces exhibits unique combinations of characters in its ascomatal structure and development.

== Description ==
Zwackhiomyces is a genus of fungi that grows parasitically or parasymbiotically (living in close association, sometimes harmfully) on lichens, particularly those containing green algae as their photosynthetic partner. The fungus produces several distinctive microscopic structures that define the genus. The fungus forms small, dark reproductive structures called pseudothecia, which range from 75 to 250 micrometres (μm) in diameter. These structures are typically pear-shaped to spherical and may be either partially or completely embedded in the host lichen's tissue. The outer surface appears black and may be either matte or slightly glossy. The wall (peridium) of the fruiting body is brown in colour and distinctively constructed, with pigments concentrated primarily in the spaces between cells (intracellular spaces). At the fruiting body's apex, these pigments form characteristic fine granules. The wall cells themselves are rounded and may compress against each other, creating a distinctive texture.

Inside the fruiting bodies, the fungus produces spore-bearing sacs called asci, which are cylindrical in shape and relatively rigid in structure. Each ascus typically contains 4, 6, or 8 spores and is equipped with a special opening mechanism (fissitunicate) that helps release the spores. The asci are surrounded by thread-like sterile filaments called paraphysoids. These filaments are branched and interconnected, embedded in a gel-like matrix, and relatively stiff in texture. They measure about 6–10 μm long and 1–2 μm wide. The spores (ascospores) are colourless (hyaline) and divided into two cells by a cross-wall (septum). They often show a fine warty surface texture and are usually asymmetrical, with the upper cell being larger and more rounded than the lower cell. The spores typically measure 11–27 μm in length.

When treated with certain laboratory stains, the fungal structures show characteristic reactions. The spore-bearing tissue turns reddish-brown with iodine, while the fungal threads (hyphae) and spore sacs often turn reddish-violet when treated with methylene blue. The warty spore surfaces may turn blue when treated with lactophenol blue stain.

== Species ==
As accepted by Species Fungorum;

- Zwackhiomyces aspiciliae Halıcı & Candan (2009) – Turkey
- Zwackhiomyces berengerianus (Arnold) Grube & Triebel (1990)
- Zwackhiomyces calcariae (Flagey) Hafellner & Nik.Hoffm. (2000)
- Zwackhiomyces calcisedus Cl.Roux (2014)
- Zwackhiomyces cervinae Calat., Triebel & Pérez-Ort. (2007)
- Zwackhiomyces coepulonus (Norman) Grube & R.Sant. (1990)
- Zwackhiomyces diederichii D.Hawksw. & Iturr. (2006)
- Zwackhiomyces dispersus (J.Lahm ex Körb.) Triebel & Grube (1990)
- Zwackhiomyces echinulatus Brackel (2008)
- Zwackhiomyces heppiae van den Boom (2010)
- Zwackhiomyces immersae (Arnold) Grube & Triebel (1990)
- Zwackhiomyces lacustris (Arnold) Orange (2002)
- Zwackhiomyces lecanorae (Stein) Nik. Hoffm. & Hafellner (2000)
- Zwackhiomyces lecideae Y.Joshi (2021)
- Zwackhiomyces lithoiceae (B.de Lesd.) Hafellner & Volk. John (2006)
- Zwackhiomyces melanohaleae Etayo & van den Boom (2014)
- Zwackhiomyces namibiensis Diederich & M.Schultz (2009)
- Zwackhiomyces parmotrematis van den Boom (2018) – Suriname
- Zwackhiomyces peltigerae Miądl. & Alstrup (1995)
- Zwackhiomyces polischukii Darmostuk & Khodos. (2017)
- Zwackhiomyces rolfii Etayo (2010)
- Zwackhiomyces sipmanii Diederich & Zhurb. (2009)
- Zwackhiomyces socialis (Körb.) Cl.Roux (2009)
- Zwackhiomyces solenopsorae van den Boom (2010)
- Zwackhiomyces sphinctrinoides (Zwackh) Grube & Hafellner (1990)
- Zwackhiomyces sulcatus Pérez-Ort. & Etayo (2011)
- Zwackhiomyces turcicus Kocakaya, Halıcı & Aksoy (2011)
