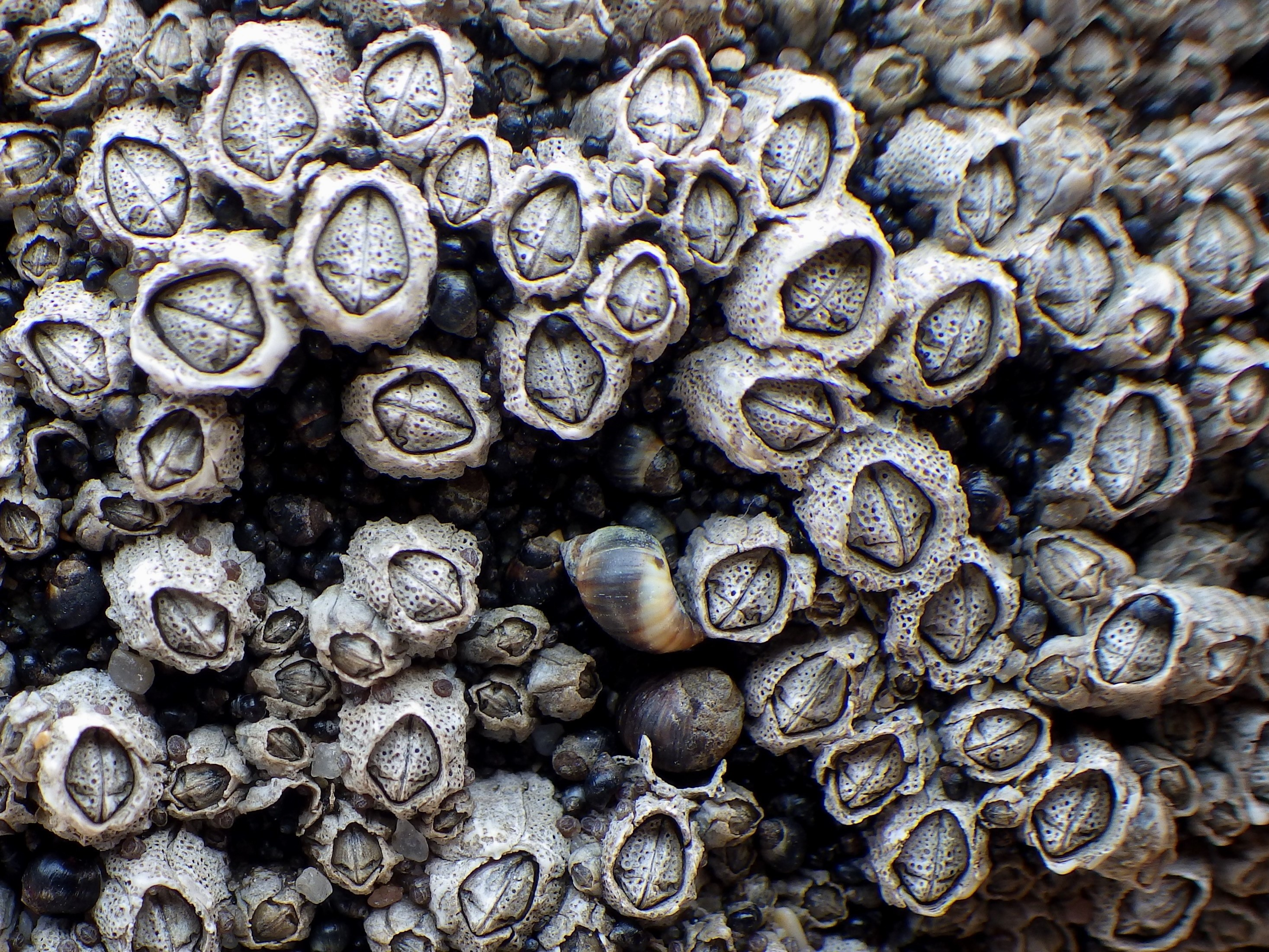
- Collemopsidium foveolatum on barnacles in Lourinhã, Portugal. The fungus is visible as black dots on the shell.

Scientific classification
- Kingdom: Fungi
- Division: Ascomycota
- Class: Dothideomycetes
- Order: Collemopsidiales
- Family: Xanthopyreniaceae
- Genus: Collemopsidium; Nyl. (1881)

Type species
- Collemopsidium iocarpum (Nyl.) Nyl. (1881)

Species
- 18 species; see text

Synonyms
- Collemopsidiomyces Cif. & Tomas. (1953); Pseudarthopyrenia Keissl. (1935); Xanthoporina C.W.Dodge (1948); Xanthopyrenia Bachm. (1919)

= Collemopsidium =

Genus of lichens

Collemopsidium is a genus of fungi in the family Xanthopyreniaceae. Some members of this genus are marine species, and described as "borderline lichens" or "algicolous" fungi.

== Taxonomy ==
The genus was circumscribed by the Finnish lichenologist William Nylander in 1881, with Collemopsidium iocarpum assigned as the type species.

== Description ==
Species of Collemopsidium form what are known as "borderline lichens" – relatively loose symbiotic associations between fungi and photosynthetic partners. The fungal portion develops an extremely thin thallus (body) that can either grow on the surface of the substrate or be completely embedded within it. When growing on the surface, the thallus appears orange-brown, smooth, and shiny. Some species may develop black carbonaceous (blackened) ridges.

The photosynthetic partner is typically Hyella caespitosa, a type of cyanobacterium that contains an orange pigment. While this cyanobacterium normally grows as filaments when living freely on mollusk shells, within the lichen partnership it usually exists as single cells measuring 3–10 micrometres in diameter. These cells may be evenly scattered throughout the thallus or concentrated in clumps, giving the lichen a blotchy appearance. In some specimens growing on shells or limestone, the photosynthetic partner may be absent.

The fungal reproductive structures (ascomata) can occur either singly or in groups and feature a black carbonaceous protective covering (involucrellum). Each reproductive structure contains spore-producing sacs (asci) with eight spores that are divided into two cells (one-septate). The internal structure includes intricately branched and persistent thread-like filaments (pseudoparaphyses). The species also commonly produce smaller spore-containing structures called pycnidia, which externally resemble miniature versions of the main reproductive structures. No secondary metabolite have been detected in these lichens.

== Habitat and distribution ==
Collemopsidium species are nearly cosmopolitan in distribution, occurring along tropical, subtropical, temperate, and arctic coastlines in both hemispheres. They display considerable tolerance to variations in temperature and salinity. These lichens can be found in the eulittoral (intertidal) and littoral fringe zones, growing on both siliceous and calcareous rock as well as on the shells of various marine organisms. Records show they colonise at least 61 different species of molluscs and barnacles, mostly in the intertidal zone, though some host species like periwinkles (Littorina) can live quite high in the littoral fringe.

The substrate significantly influences their growth patterns. On siliceous rock, the thallus always grows on the surface, and the reproductive structures remain above the substrate. On calcareous rock and shells, the thallus may grow either on the surface or become embedded within the substrate, with reproductive structures that can be either surface-level or immersed. Different forms are commonly found growing side by side on the same substrate. While the lichens do not appear to harm their living substrates, they can alter the nature of shell matrices, sometimes affecting shell appearance to such an extent that it causes taxonomic confusion in limpet species.

Limestone shores typically show less distinct zonation of lichens in the eulittoral and littoral fringe zones compared to siliceous shores, and display lower species diversity. However, Collemopsidium species often achieve higher coverage on limestone shores due to their ability to grow within the substrate, allowing them to persist despite erosion.

== Species ==
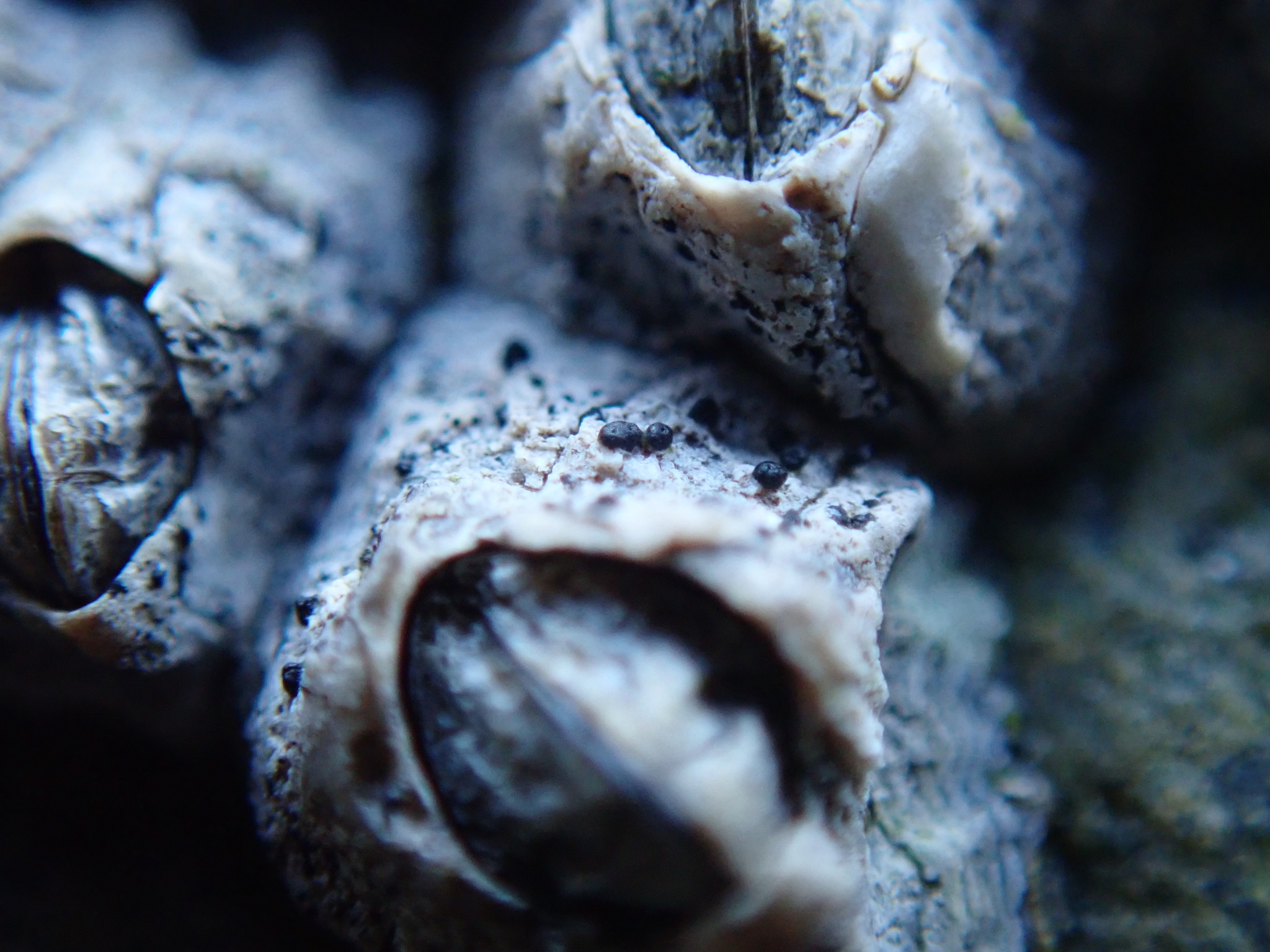
The perithecia of the "borderline lichen" species C. sublitorale appear as black dots on the surface of barnacle shells.

As of January 2025, Species Fungorum (in the Catalogue of Life) accept 18 species. of Collemopsidium:

- Collemopsidium angermannicum (G.B.F.Nilsson) A.Nordin (2002)
- Collemopsidium arenisedum (A.L.Sm.) Coppins & Aptroot (2008)
- Collemopsidium caesium (Nyl.) Coppins & Aptroot (2008)
- Collemopsidium cephalodiorum (Triebel & Grube) Grube (2005)
- Collemopsidium chlorococcum (Aptroot & van den Boom) Coppins & Aptroot (2008)
- Collemopsidium foveolatum (A.L.Sm.) F.Mohr (2004)
- Collemopsidium heardense (C.W.Dodge & E.D.Rudolph) Øvstedal (2010)
- Collemopsidium iocarpum (Nyl.) Nyl. (1881)
- Collemopsidium japonicum (H.Harada) H.Harada (2004)
- Collemopsidium kostikovii Khodos. & Darmostuk (2017) – Ukraine
- Collemopsidium mauritiae Diederich & Ertz (2020) – Mauritius
- Collemopsidium monense (Wheldon) Coppins & Aptroot (2008)
- Collemopsidium montanum (P.M.McCarthy & Kantvilas) P.M.McCarthy (2009)
- Collemopsidium ostrearum (Vain.) F.Mohr (2004)
- Collemopsidium pyrenuloides C.W.Dodge & E.D.Rudolph (1955) – Antarctica
- Collemopsidium subarenisedum (G.Salisb.) Coppins & Aptroot (2008)
- Collemopsidium sublitorale (Leight.) Grube & B.D.Ryan (2002)
- Collemopsidium tasmanicum (P.M.McCarthy & Kantvilas) P.M.McCarthy (2009)
