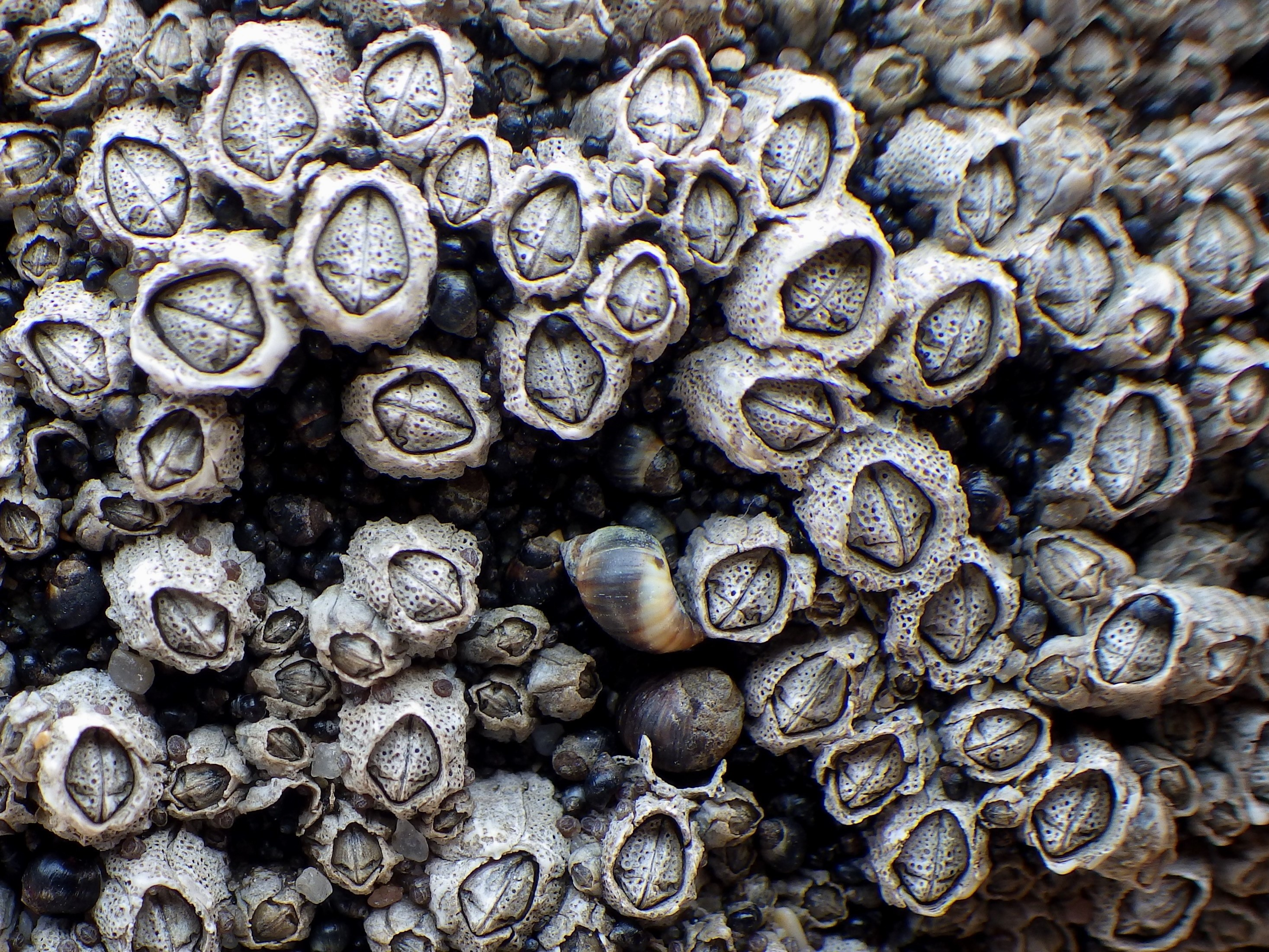
- Collemopsidium foveolatum in Lourinhã, Portugal

Scientific classification
- Kingdom: Fungi
- Division: Ascomycota
- Class: Dothideomycetes
- Order: Collemopsidiales
- Family: Xanthopyreniaceae; Zahlbr. (1926)

Type genus
- Xanthopyrenia Bachm. (1919)

Genera
- Collemopsidium; Didymellopsis; Frigidopyrenia; Pyrenocollema; Rhagadodidymellopsis; Zwackhiomacromyces; Zwackhiomyces

= Xanthopyreniaceae =

Family of lichen-forming fungi

The Xanthopyreniaceae are a family of lichen-forming fungi in the order Collemopsidiales. Members of this family are found worldwide on rocks in various climates, from temperate to polar regions, where they form inconspicuous crusty growths or live hidden within the rock surface. Where lichenised, species partner with cyanobacteria, and several lineages are parasitic (lichenicolous) on other lichens. The family is characterized by small, dark fruiting bodies that release spores through a single opening at the top.

== Taxonomy ==
The family was circumscribed by the lichenologist Alexander Zahlbruckner in 1926.

In 1988, David Hawksworth and Ove Eriksson proposed conserving the name Arthopyreniaceae and rejecting Xanthopyreniaceae (nom. cons. prop.; nom. rej. prop.). They argued that usage in the literature overwhelmingly favoured Arthopyreniaceae, while Xanthopyrenia was commonly treated as a synonym of Arthopyrenia (and, more recently, of Pyrenocollema).

André Aptroot treated Xanthopyreniaceae as a lichen-forming lineage of pyrenocarpous ascomycetes placed within Pyrenulales, alongside Pyrenulaceae. In his scheme, pyrenocarpous lichens are concentrated in a few coherent lineages rather than scattered across unrelated groups. Drawing on morphology, he regarded the characters used to split the old broadly defined Arthopyrenia into multiple families and even orders, especially differences in the hamathecium, as insufficient for such wide separation, and he retained these taxa in one order (Pyrenulales) and two families. He further noted that Pyrenulales typically have dark, carbonised (blackened) fruit-body walls of intricately interwoven cells (contrasting with the large, angular-celled walls typical of many Pleosporales), a practical feature that helps explain why Xanthopyreniaceae fits best within Pyrenulales. Earlier schemes had placed related families in Pleosporales or even Dothideales, and his comparison tables summarised these competing placements while emphasising that higher-order relationships remained unsettled given the limited and sometimes contradictory molecular data then available.

Later multi-locus phylogenies (nuLSU, nuSSU, mtSSU, rpb1, rpb2, tef1-α) sampling Collemopsidium and Zwackhiomyces positioned Xanthopyreniaceae within the Dothideomyceta, but left its affinity to Dothideomycetes versus Arthoniomycetes unresolved. On that basis, Pérez-Ortega and colleagues erected the order Collemopsidiales to accommodate the family (including Collemopsidium and the lichenicolous Zwackhiomyces), estimated a Triassic crown age of roughly 230 Ma for the clade, and reported that marine Collemopsidium as currently delimited is likely paraphyletic with substantially underestimated species diversity.

== Description ==
Members of the Xanthopyreniaceae are lichen-forming or lichen-dwelling fungi whose body (thallus) is usually crustose but may be reduced or even absent in species that live on other lichens (lichenicolous). When present, the thallus grows on rock surfaces (epilithic) or within the outer layers of rock (endolithic). Their photosynthetic partners, where present, are cyanobacteria, which can be thread-like (filamentous) or spherical (coccoid). These fungi lack stromata (supporting cushions of fungal tissue that bear reproductive structures).

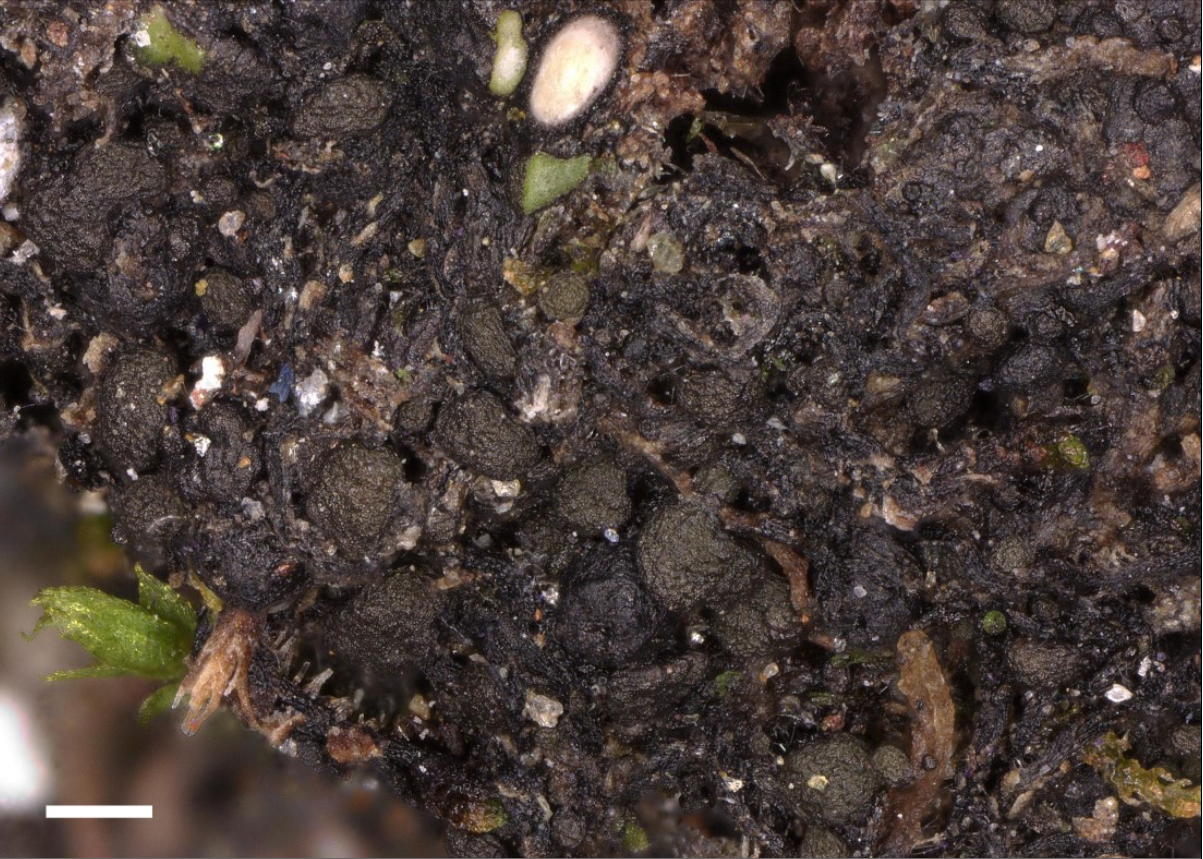
Frigidopyrenia bryospila is a crustose arctic lichen.

Sexual fruiting bodies are perithecia: small, flask-shaped structures with a pore (ostiole) at the top; in some species the pore is widened enough to give an apothecium-like, open appearance. Perithecia are solitary and contain a single internal cavity (unilocular). A dark outer sheath (involucrellum) may be present. The perithecial wall ranges from carbonised and dark to pale and nearly colourless, and is built from either intertwined fungal threads (hyphae) or more rounded cells. Inside the cavity, the sterile threads (hamathecium) form a net-like mesh of branched, interconnecting pseudoparaphyses. The gel that surrounds the spore-bearing layer does not stain blue with iodine (I–). The asci are fissitunicate (double-walled and splitting when mature), ovoid to somewhat cylindrical, often with a stalk; their tips have a small clear chamber (an ocular chamber), they are iodine-negative, and they usually contain eight ascospores.

The ascospores are colourless (occasionally becoming brownish in very old material), cylindrical to ovoid-fusiform, and divided by one to three cross walls. A gelatinous outer envelope (perispore) is commonly present. Asexual reproduction occurs in pycnidia—minute, flask-like structures that produce non-motile spores (conidia). The conidia are formed on roughly cylindrical cells that extend by percurrent growth (adding successive collars as they elongate), and the conidia themselves range from rod-shaped (bacilliform) to narrowly ellipsoidal. No characteristic lichen secondary metabolites have been detected in this family using thin-layer chromatography.

== Genera ==
This is a list of the genera in the Xanthopyreniaceae, based on The 2024 Outline of Fungi and fungus-like taxa. Following the genus name is the taxonomic authority (those who first circumscribed the genus; standardized author abbreviations are used), year of publication, and the number of species:

- Collemopsidium Nyl. (1881) – 27 spp.
- Didymellopsis (Sacc.) Clem. & Shear (1931) – 6 spp.
- Frigidopyrenia Grube (2005) – 1 sp.
- Pyrenocollema Reinke (1895) – 7 spp.
- Rhagadodidymellopsis Fern.-Brime, Gaya, Llimona & Nav.-Ros. (2020) – 1 sp.
- Zwackhiomacromyces Etayo & van den Boom (2014) – 2 spp.
- Zwackhiomyces Grube & Hafellner (1990) – 35 spp.
