= Collemopsidiales =

Scientific classification
- Kingdom: Fungi
- Division: Ascomycota
- Class: Dothideomycetes
- Order: Collemopsidiales; Pérez-Ortega, Garrido-Benavent & Grube, 2016

Families
- Xanthopyreniaceae

Order of fungi

Collemopsidiales is an order of fungi in the class Dothideomycetes. First circumscribed by Sergio Pérez-Ortega, Isaac Garrido-Benavent and Martin Grube in 2016, it contains a single family, Xanthopyreniaceae.

== Taxonomy ==
Collemopsidales is an order of lichenised and lichenicolous (lichen-dwelling) ascomycetes, proposed in 2016 by Sergio Pérez-Ortega, Isaac Garrido-Benavent and Martin Grube. The protologue designates Collemopsidium as the type genus. Six-locus molecular phylogenetic analyses place the Xanthopyreniaceae—the sole family assigned to the order—within the superclass Dothideomyceta, but its exact affinity to the classes Dothideomycetes and Arthoniomycetes remains unresolved. To reflect this independent lineage the authors erected Collemopsidales, encompassing Collemopsidium (paraphyletic in its broad sense) together with the lichenicolous genus Zwackhiomyces. A relaxed-clock analysis (methods that allow for varying rates of molecular evolution across different branches of a phylogenetic tree) suggests that the crown group of the order originated about 230 million years ago, during the Triassic.

== Description ==
Members of Collemopsidales form thin, crust-like thalli that adhere tightly to the surface they occupy (crustose growth). Most species live directly on rock, either on the surface (epilithic) or boring into it (endolithic), while others parasitise the thalli of existing lichens (lichenicolous). In every case the fungal partner associates with cyanobacteria, which may occur as fine filaments or as single spherical cells, thereby providing the photosynthetic component of the lichen symbiosis.

== Citations ==
=== References ===
- "Collemopsidiales". Index Fungorum. 2022.
- Pérez-Ortega, Sergio; Garrido-Benavent, Isaac; Grube, Martin; Olmo, Rocío (March 2016). "Hidden diversity of marine borderline lichens and a new order of fungi: Collemopsidiales (Dothideomyceta)". Fungal Diversity. 80: 285–300. doi:10.1007/s13225-016-0361-1.
- Wijayawardene, N.N.; Hyde, K.D.; Dai, D.Q.; Sánchez-García, M.; Goto, B.T.; Saxena, R.K.; et al. (2022). "Outline of Fungi and fungus-like taxa – 2021". Mycosphere. 13 (1): 53–453. doi:10.5943/mycosphere/13/1/2. hdl:10481/76378. S2CID 249054641.
