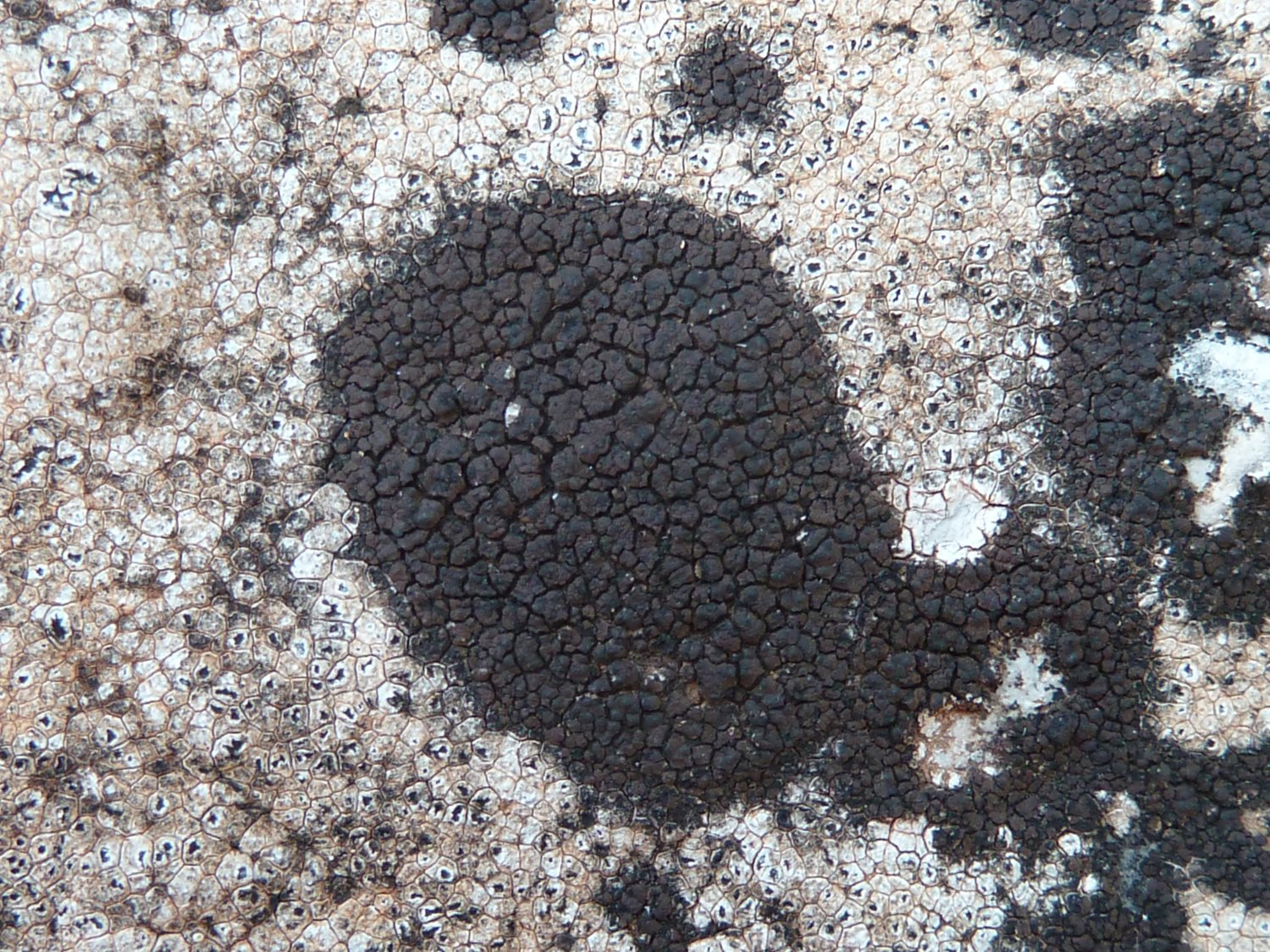
- Heteroplacidium fusculum

Scientific classification
- Domain: Eukaryota
- Kingdom: Fungi
- Division: Ascomycota
- Class: Eurotiomycetes
- Order: Verrucariales
- Family: Verrucariaceae
- Genus: Heteroplacidium; Breuss (1996)

Type species
- Heteroplacidium imbricatum (Nyl.) Breuss (1996)

= Heteroplacidium =

Genus of lichens

Heteroplacidium is a genus of lichen-forming fungi in the family Verrucariaceae. The genus was circumscribed by Austrian lichenologist Othmar Breuss in 1996 with Heteroplacidium imbricatum assigned as the type species. It was proposed as a segregate of Catapyrenium. Other morphologically similar genera are Neocatapyrenium, Placidium, and Scleropyrenium, although molecular phylogenetic analyses indicate that they are independent monophyletic lineages within the Verrucariaceae.

Most Heteroplacidium species are autonomous lichens, generally crustose and areolate. Four species in the genus are obligate parasites or facultatively lichenicolous – H. compactum, H. fusculum, H. transmutans, and H. zamenhofianum.

== Species ==
- Heteroplacidium acarosporoides (Zahlbr.) Breuss (1996)
- Heteroplacidium acervatum (Breuss) Breuss (1996)
- Heteroplacidium compactum (A.Massal.) Gueidan & Cl.Roux (2008)
- Heteroplacidium congestum (Breuss & McCune) Breuss (1996)
- Heteroplacidium contumescens (Nyl.) Breuss (1996)
- Heteroplacidium divisum (Zahlbr.) Breuss (1996)
- Heteroplacidium endocarpoides (Breuss) Breuss (1996)
- Heteroplacidium fusculum (Nyl.) Gueidan & Cl.Roux (2007)
- Heteroplacidium imbricatum (Nyl.) Breuss (1996)
- Heteroplacidium phaeocarpoides (Nyl.) Breuss (1996)
- Heteroplacidium podolepis (Breuss) Breuss (1996)
- Heteroplacidium transmutans K.Knudsen, Breuss & Kocourk. (2014)
- Heteroplacidium zamenhofianum (Clauzade & Cl.Roux) Gueidan & Cl.Roux (2007)
