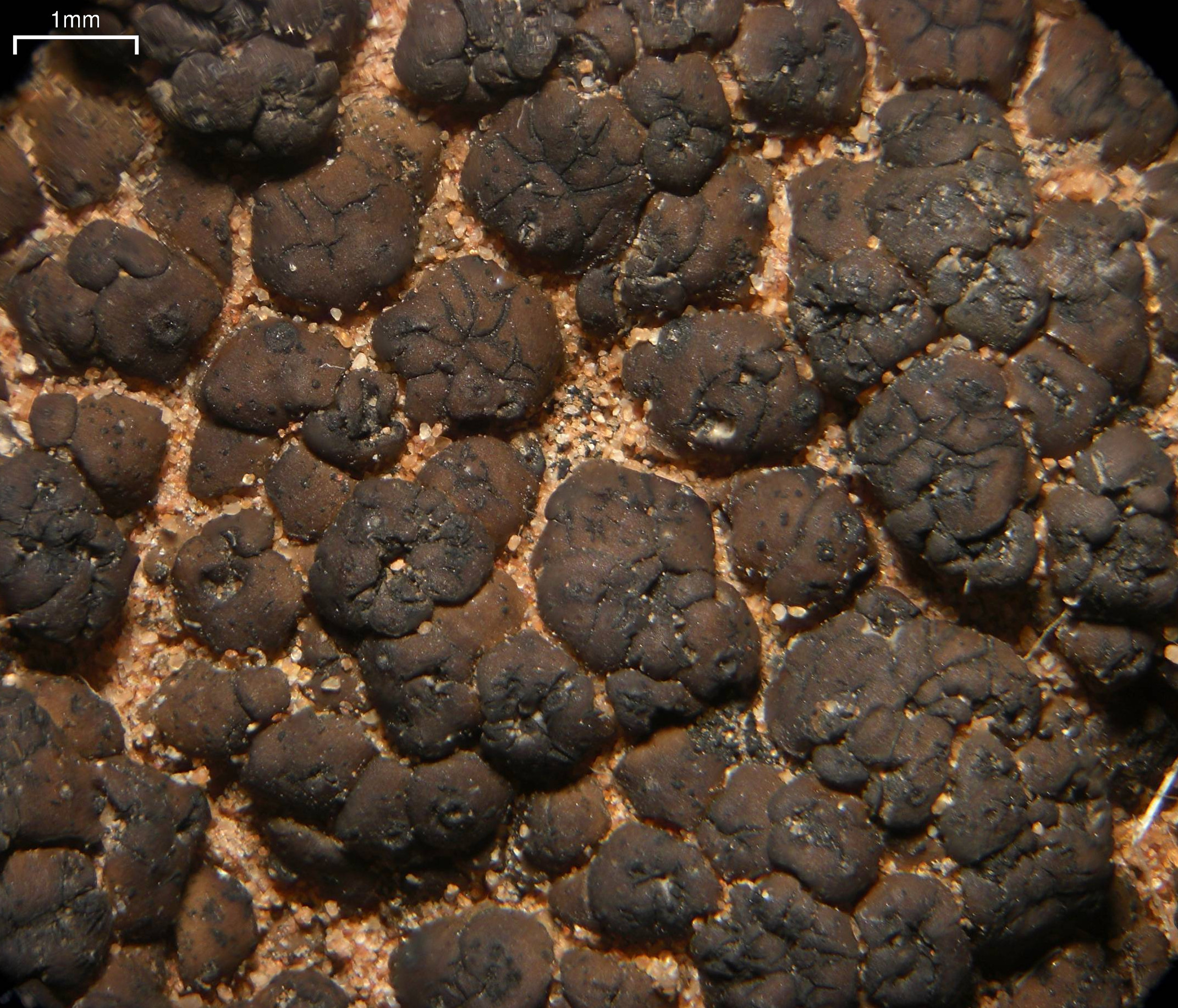

Scientific classification
- Domain: Eukaryota
- Kingdom: Fungi
- Division: Ascomycota
- Class: Eurotiomycetes
- Order: Verrucariales
- Family: Verrucariaceae
- Genus: Heteroplacidium
- Species: H. acarosporoides

Binomial name
- Heteroplacidium acarosporoides (Zahlbr.) Breuss 1996

Synonyms
- Dermatocarpon acarosporoides Zahlbr. 1902 - basionym; Catapyrenium acarosporoides (Zahlbr.) J.W.Thomson 1987 - obligate synonym; Placidium acarosporoides (Zahlbr.) Breuss 2000 - obligate synonym

= Heteroplacidium acarosporoides =

Species of fungus

Heteroplacidium acarosporoides (Mojave stipplescale) is a glossy reddish to dark brown or black squamulose lichen dotted with black perithecia that grows on rock.
