= Heteroplacidium zamenhofianum =

Scientific classification
- Kingdom: Fungi
- Division: Ascomycota
- Class: Eurotiomycetes
- Order: Verrucariales
- Family: Verrucariaceae
- Genus: Heteroplacidium
- Species: H. zamenhofianum

Binomial name
- Heteroplacidium zamenhofianum (Clauzade & Cl.Roux) Gueidan & Cl.Roux (2007)

Synonyms
- Verrucaria zamenhofiana Clauzade & Cl.Roux (1985)

Species of lichen

Heteroplacidium zamenhofianum is a species of lichenicolous (lichen-eating) lichen in the family Verrucariaceae. As a juvenile, it is parasitic on some members of the lichen genus Staurothele, but later becomes independent and develops a brown, crustose thallus. Characteristic features of the lichen include its dark brown, somewhat squamulous thallus and relatively small ascospores. It is widely distributed in Europe and North America.

== Taxonomy ==
The lichen was first formally described in 1985 by lichenologists Georges Clauzade and Claude Roux as a species of Verrucaria. The original publication was written in Esperanto, and the species epithet honours L. L. Zamenhof, creator of this language. Cécile Gueidan and Roux transferred the taxon to Heteroplacidium in 2007, after previous molecular phylogenetic analysis suggested that it should be placed in that genus.

== Habitat and distribution ==
Heteroplacidium zamenhofianum is initially parasitic on members of the Staurothele areolata species group, but becomes independent later in its life. The lichen was first reported from the Alps and the Pyrenees, and later from the Ural Mountains in Russia, and Krasnodar Krai and Republic of Adygea in North Caucasus. It was reported from North America for the first time in 1994. In the San Bernardino Mountains of California, it was found growing on Staurothele drummondii.
