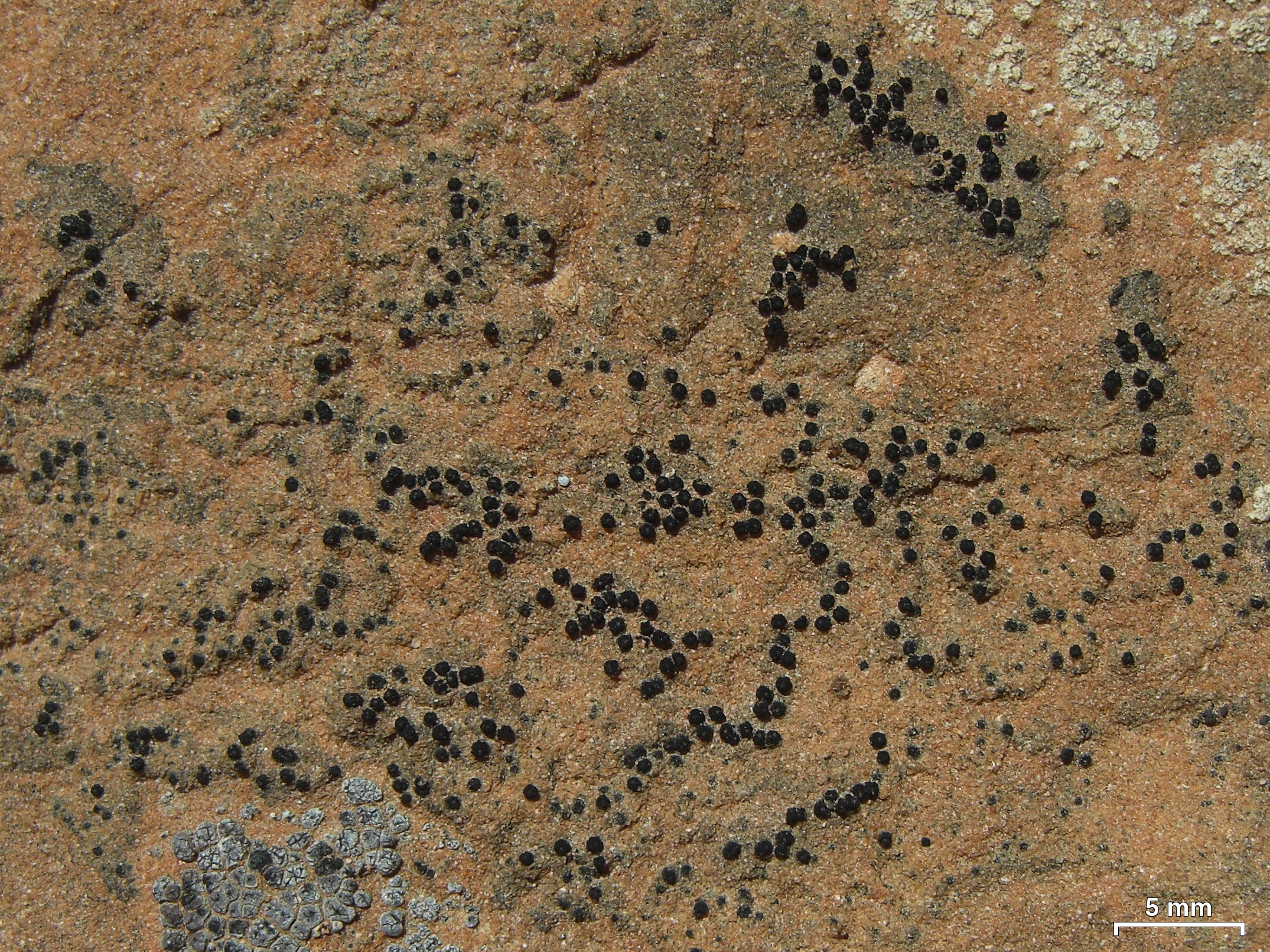
- Near Canyonlands, Utah; scale bar = 5 mm

Conservation status
- Apparently Secure (NatureServe)

Scientific classification
- Domain: Eukaryota
- Kingdom: Fungi
- Division: Ascomycota
- Class: Eurotiomycetes
- Order: Verrucariales
- Family: Verrucariaceae
- Genus: Staurothele
- Species: S. elenkinii

Binomial name
- Staurothele elenkinii Oxner (1927)

= Staurothele elenkinii =

Species of lichen

Staurothele elenkinii is a species of saxicolous (rock-dwelling) lichen in the family Verrucariaceae. It was described as new to science by Ukrainian lichenologist Alfred Oxner in 1927, from the steppes of Ukraine. In 2013 it was recorded from the northeast Caucasus, in Russia. It is also widespread on dry rocks in the North American west, ranging from the Northwest Territories south to the southwestern United States. It grows on shales, sandstones, and calcareous rocks.

== Description ==
The thallus of Staurothele elenkinii is scant, sometimes limited to tiny black verrucules (minute, pimple-like structures) on the rock surface. In other cases, the thallus is apparent as only a paling of the natural rock colour. Perithecia occur singly in the verrucules, measuring up to 0.5 mm in width. They are hemispherical with a constricted base and a constricted involucrellum. The ascospores number two per ascus; they are dark brown, muriform, i.e., divided into internal chambers by up to eight transverse septa and three longitudinal septa, and measure 33–62 by 18–33 μm.

Another Staurothele species, found in the southern Great Plains in central North America, Staurothele nemorum, is somewhat similar in appearance. S. nemorum can be distinguished from S. elenkinii by its eight-spored asci, and by its shorter (23.8–31.4 by 11.5–14.4 μm), hyaline or pale-coloured ascospores.
