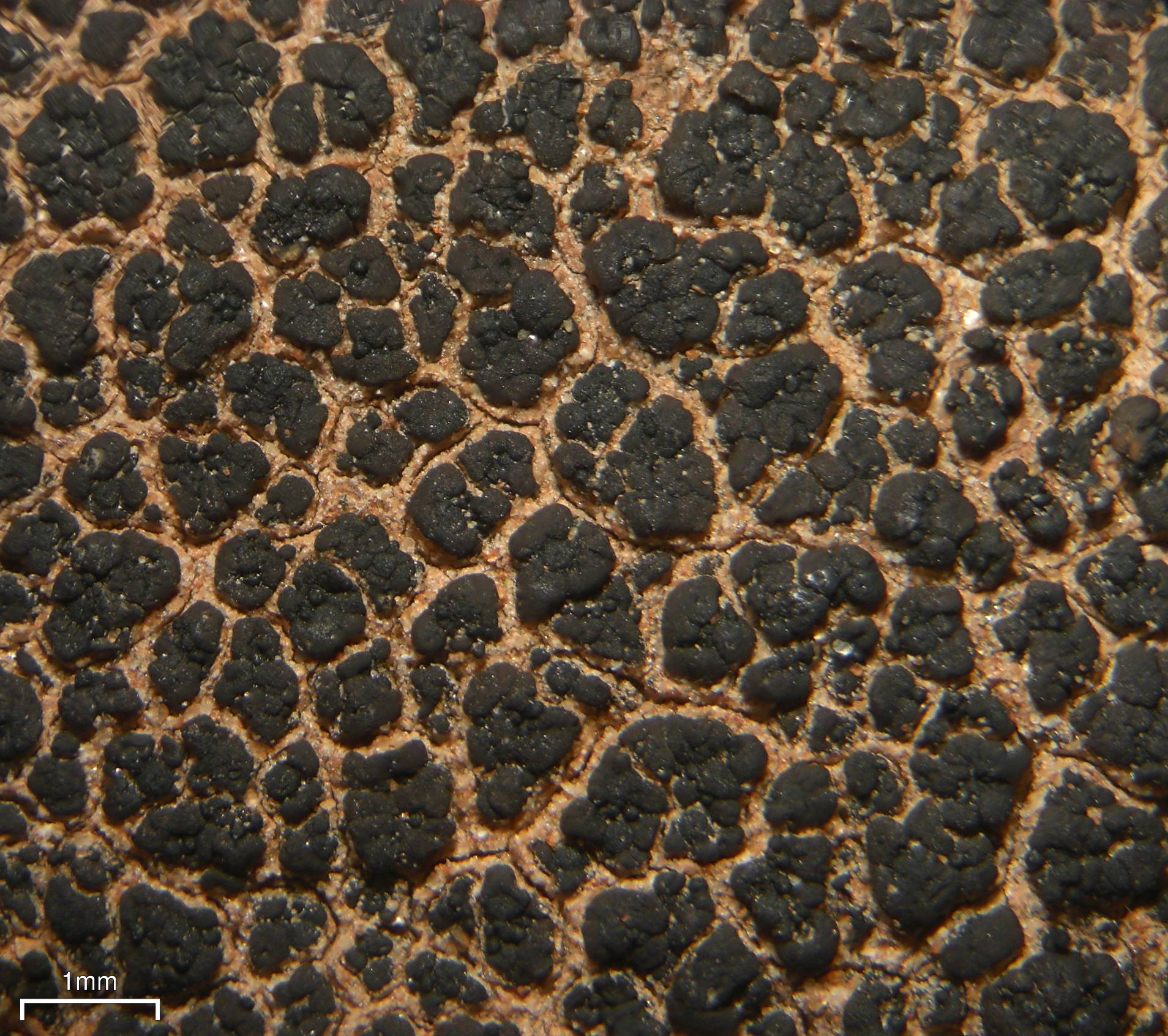

Conservation status
- Vulnerable (NatureServe)

Scientific classification
- Kingdom: Fungi
- Division: Ascomycota
- Class: Eurotiomycetes
- Order: Verrucariales
- Family: Verrucariaceae
- Genus: Heteroplacidium
- Species: H. compactum

Binomial name
- Heteroplacidium compactum (A.Massal.) Gueidan & Cl.Roux (2008)

Synonyms
- List: Catapyrenium compactum (A.Massal.) R.Sant. (1984); Dermatocarpon compactum (A.Massal.) Lettau (1912); Endocarpon compactum (A.Massal.) Nyl. (1858); Endopyrenium compactum (A.Massal.) Körb. (1863); Placidium compactum A.Massal. (1856); Placocarpus compactus (A.Massal.) Trevis. (1860); Rhodocarpon compactum (A.Massal.) Lönnr. (1858); Verrucaria compacta (A.Massal.) Jatta (1900)

= Heteroplacidium compactum =

Species of lichen

Heteroplacidium compactum is a species of areolate, crustose lichen in the family Verrucariaceae. It has a cosmopolitan distribution. It is a lichenicolous lichen, growing as a facultative parasite on other lichens, typically on non-calcareous rock. It has rod-shaped (bacilliform) conidia measuring 5–7 μm long, and ascospores that are 11–18 by 8–10 μm. Heteroplacidium zamenhofianum is a closely related species distinguished by having perithecia situated in the algal layer, and smaller ascospores (14–16 by 6–7 μm) with a more narrow ellipsoid shape.

The lichen was originally described in 1857 by Italian lichenologist Abramo Bartolommeo Massalongo as Placidium compactum. After having been shuffled to various genera in its taxonomic history, it was transferred to Heteroplacidium in 2008 following molecular phylogenetic analysis of that genus.
