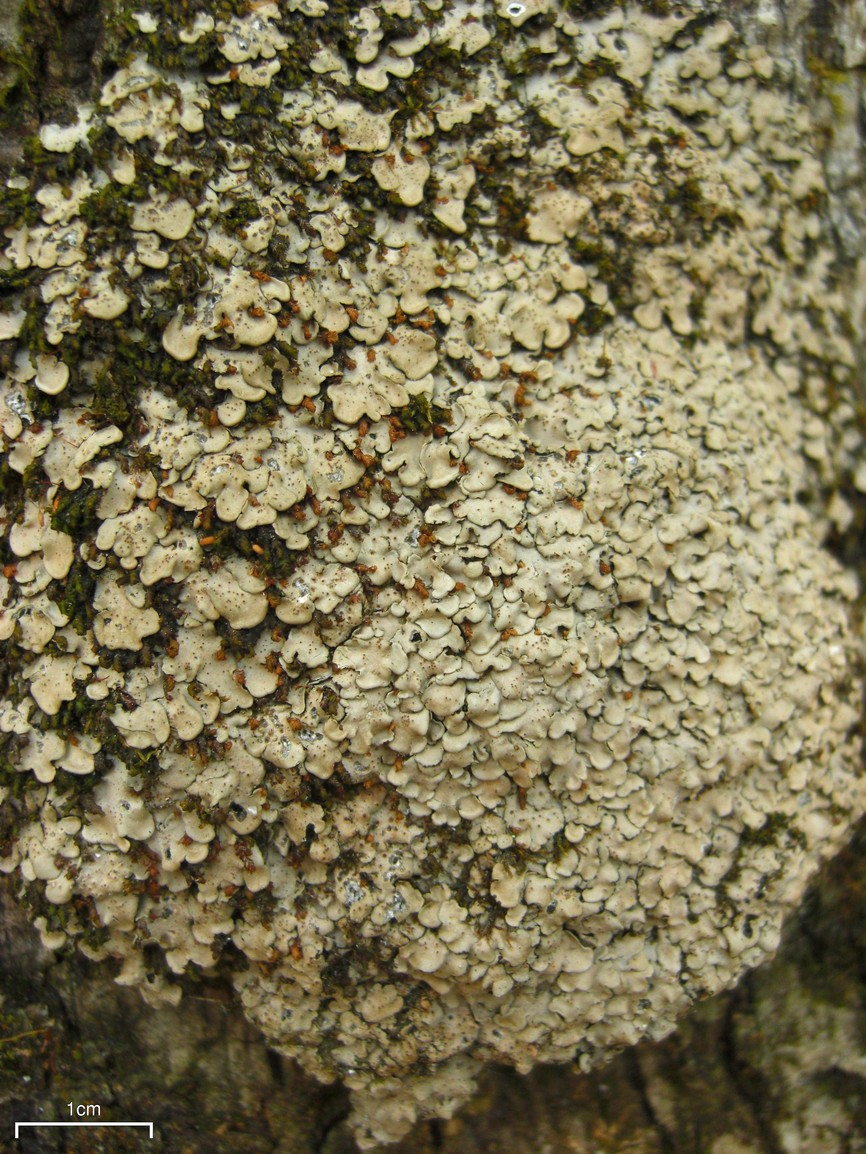
- In the Great Smoky Mountains of North Carolina (southeastern United States)

Conservation status
- Secure (NatureServe)

Scientific classification
- Kingdom: Fungi
- Division: Ascomycota
- Class: Eurotiomycetes
- Order: Verrucariales
- Family: Verrucariaceae
- Genus: Placidium
- Species: P. arboreum

Binomial name
- Placidium arboreum (Schwein. ex E.Michener) Lendemer (2004)

Synonyms
- List: Endocarpon arboreum Schwein. (1831); Endocarpon arboreum Schwein. ex E.Michener (1853); Dermatocarpon arboreum (Schwein. ex E.Michener) Fink (1910); Endocarpon tuckermanii Ravenel ex Mont. (1856); Endopyrenium tuckermanii (Ravenel ex Mont.) Müll.Arg. (1884); Dermatocarpon tuckermanii (Ravenel ex Mont.) Zahlbr. (1921); Catapyrenium tuckermanii (Ravenel ex Mont.) J.W.Thomson (1987); Placidium tuckermanii (Ravenel ex Mont.) Breuss (1996)

= Placidium arboreum =

Species of lichen

Placidium arboreum, commonly known as the tree stipplescale, is a species of corticolous (bark-dwelling), squamulose (scaley) lichen in the family Verrucariaceae. Placidium arboreum is primarily found in the southeastern United States, but it also has occurrences in the western and northeastern United States, Mexico, the West Indies, Argentina, and Ontario, Canada. In its habitat, it typically grows at the base of hardwood trees, particularly oak species, and can occasionally be found on other tree genera or even over mosses on limestone. Its preferred substrate is the bark of oak trees, and the lichen usually establishes itself in bark crevices.

Originally described as Endocarpon arboreum in 1831, Placidium arboreum underwent various taxonomic changes before acquiring its current generic placement in 2004. Some authors had referred to it as Endocarpon tuckermanii, but the name with the species epithet tuckermanii is now considered synonymous.

== Taxonomy ==
The lichen was first mentioned in the scientific literature as Endocarpon arboreum in an 1831 publication of Swedish botanist and mycologist Elias Fries, who attributed authorship to German-American botanist and mycologist Lewis David de Schweinitz. Fries wrote of the lichen: "In addition there is a variety, Endocarpon arboreum of Schweinitz from North America, which by its description should be referred here but from its whole structure seems to be a poorly developed Sticta". Fries does not seem to have accepted it as a valid species. Further, because no description or diagnosis of the taxon was provided (i.e., as a nomen nudum, or "naked name"), the name was not validly published according to nomenclatural rules. American botanist Ezra Michener published the taxon validly when he included a brief description of the species in American botanist William Darlington's 1853 work Flora Cestrica. American lichenologist Bruce Fink proposed a transfer to the genus Dermatocarpon in 1910. The taxon acquired its current generic placement when American lichenologist James Lendemer transferred it to Placidium in 2004. Molecular phylogenetics reveals that Placidium arboreum is sister to a clade of Placidium species characterized by cylindrical asci in their early developmental stages.

According to Lendemer, some later authors have used the specific epithet tuckermanii for this species (Endocarpon tuckermanii Ravenel ex Mont. was validly published by Camille Montagne in 1856). This was because in 1956, American lichenologist Mason Hale designated the name Endocarpon arboreum as a nomen nudum, which opened the way to use the epithet tuckermanii; he was apparently not aware of Michener's publication. Since Michener's description of the species was published earlier than Montagne's, it has priority, and those names (and later recombinations) with epithet tuckermanii are relegated to synonymy.

Lichens in the genus Placidium are generally known in the vernacular as "stipplescale lichens"; the specific common name used for this species is "tree stipplescale". Placidium arboreum belongs to the catapyrenioid group within the Verrucariaceae, characterized by over 80 lichens that are squamulose (scaley), possess simple ascospores (devoid of septa), and do not contain algae in the hymenium.

== Description ==
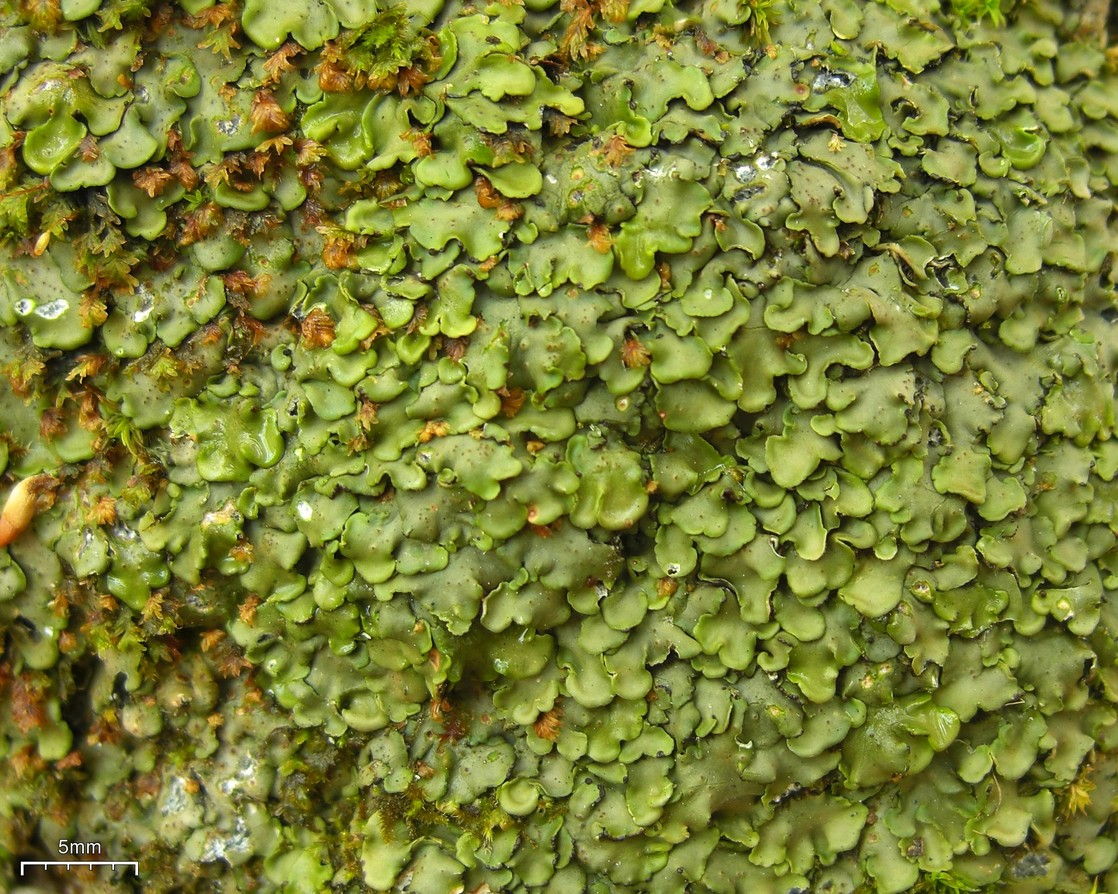
Placidium arboreum becomes green when wet.

It has a squamulose (scaly) thallus comprising individual rounded lobes typically measuring 2–5 mm (1/16–3/16 in) wide, although squamule widths of up to 10 mm (3/8 in) are also reported. These are relatively large, more or less overlapping squamules. In a field guide to lichens of Great Smoky Mountains National Park, the authors highlight the distinctiveness of the species due to its uniquely large squamules. This characteristic makes it stand out, and in this region, it is rarely mistaken for other species. The lichen is normally shades of brown and grey, but becomes bright green when wet. The medulla is white.

Dark brown, dot-like perithecia are scattered on the thallus surface. The underside of the thallus is paler in colour, with tufts of rhizohyphae that attach to the substrata. All of the standard chemical spot tests are negative, and it does not have any known lichen products. The ascospores made by the lichen are ellipsoid in shape, with dimensions of 10–15 by 4–6 μm. The photobiont partner of the lichen is chlorococcoid – a green alga from genus Chlorococcum.

=== Similar species ===
Catapyrenium cinereum is another squamulose lichen that bears a resemblance to Placidium arboreum. Several distinctions can be observed in Catapyrenium cinereum – its brown to black rhizohyphae, the formation of a thick, dark hypothallus, a typically densely pruinose upper surface, and clavate (club-shaped) asci. Although some species from the genus Clavascidium may appear similar, they are characterized by specific rhizines and/or clavate asci.

== Habitat and distribution ==
Placidium arboreum is widely distributed in the southeastern United States, with a few scattered occurrences in the western and northeastern United States. It is rare in California, with some reports from locations in the Coast Range. The North American range of the lichen extends south to Mexico. The lichen has also been found in the West Indies and has been recorded in Tucumán, Argentina, where it was growing in a rainforest at an elevation of 1,200 m (3,900 ft). In 2017, it was recorded for the first time in Canada after it was found in a few locations in Ontario; it is considered an uncommon species in this province.

The lichen typically grows at the base of hardwood trees, and the bark of oak is a preferred substratum. Placidium arboreum has been recorded on several oak species: Quercus alba (white oak) is a predominant associate in the northern part of its range, Q. stellata (post oak) and Q. muehlenbergii (chinkapin) occur further south, while Q. virginiana (southern live oak), Q. arizonica (Arizona white oak), and Q. douglasii (blue oak) are associated with the lichen in the south and southwest parts of its range. Tree genera that associate with Placidium arboreum less commonly include Ulmus (elm), Fraxinus (ash), Carya (hickory), Platanus, Liquidambar (sweetgum), Acer (maple), and Salix (willow). The lichen generally establishes itself in the crevices of the bark. In rare instances, it has been recorded growing over mosses on limestone.
