= Kate Crooks =

Catharine McGill Crooks
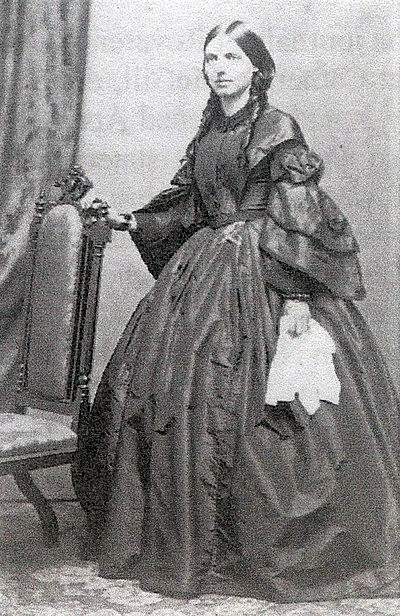
- Born: February 13, 1833; Niagara-on-the-Lake
- Died: March 23, 1871 (aged 38); Toronto
- Occupation: Botanist

Catharine (Kate) McGill Crooks Smart or Kate Crooks (February 13, 1833 – March 23, 1871) was a botanist and member of the Botanical Society of Canada. Her pressed botanical specimens were displayed in London, England at the International Exhibition of 1862, and her botanical records were cited in the Catalogue of Canadian Plants; published as part of the Geological Survey of Canada. She was a member of the Crooks family, a prominent family of merchants, industrialists, civil servants, politicians, and landowners in the nineteenth-century British colony of Upper Canada.

== Early life ==
Kate Crooks was born on February 13, 1833, in Newark, Upper Canada (now Niagara-on-the-Lake, Ontario). Her father, John Crooks, was born in Greenock, Scotland, and emigrated to Canada in the early 1800s. Kate Crooks' mother was Mary Gumsby Lawrason, the daughter of United Empire Loyalists from New Jersey. Kate Crooks was the youngest of four children.

Just weeks after her birth, Crooks' father John died of scarlet fever. Following the loss of her husband, Mary Lawrason Crooks suffered a stroke, and declined in health. To support their family, Kate Crooks' older sisters founded a girls' school in the family home.

== Work ==
Kate Crooks joined the Botanical Society of Canada in 1861. The Botanical Society of Canada was founded at Queen's College (now Queen's University) in Kingston, Canada West (now Kingston, Ontario). At this time, Kate contributed to a flora of Hamilton, Ontario, published by her brother-in-law Alexander Logie. Along with botanist John Macoun, she was a co-author on Returns of the periodical phenomena of vegetation during the season 1861. Her own paper, Remarks on the species of oak, their history, habits and uses was presented at the Botanical Society of Canada's seventh meeting, on June 14, 1861. Crooks' botanical specimens of native Canadian plants were exhibited in London at the International Exhibition of 1862. She received an honourable mention for these works, which were shown alongside examples of Canadian forestry, fisheries, and agricultural products. Crooks also exhibited her work at Canadian agricultural fairs, including one in Toronto, three weeks before the birth of her first child.

== Family ==
Kate Crooks' father, John Crooks, was the postmaster at Newark, and a church elder at St. Andrew's Presbyterian church. He was also an owner and publisher of the Niagara Herald newspaper. Between 1820 and his death in 1833, John Crooks taught what is believed to have been the first Sunday School in the Niagara region.

Kate Crooks' uncle, James Crooks, was a merchant, landowner and politician who had fought in the War of 1812 as a captain of the local militia. Another uncle, Ramsay Crooks, was a Canadian fur trader. Her uncle Francis Crooks was a member of the Niagara Agricultural Society; which imported new varieties of fruiting trees to the region and held the province's first agricultural fair in 1799. In 1806, Francis Crooks’ daughter, Jane Crooks, was the first woman granted membership to the Niagara-on-the-Lake Public Library.

Crooks' collaborator, Alexander Logie, was a judge of Wentworth county. He married Kate Crooks' sister, Mary Ritchie Crooks.

Marriage and children

In July 1865, Kate married William Lynn Smart, a barrister. Together, they had three children: Eleanor Herbert Mary Charlotte Smart (October 15, 1866–?), John Alder Newton Smart (September 11, 1868 – November 7, 1892), and William Catherinus Gregory Smart (March 15, 1871 – April 17, 1938)

== Death ==
Kate Crooks died in Toronto on March 23, 1871, eight days after the birth of her third child. She was buried in Hamilton, Ontario.

After her death, Kate's bereaved husband and young children were sued by three of her four sisters; Margaret, Mary, and Susan. They contested the terms of their sister's will, based on her status as a married woman. Adam Crooks, then a Liberal cabinet member in the provincial legislature, successfully put forward the Married Women’s Real Estate Act (1873), under which married women could hold and dispose of property in their own right. The Act passed into law in Ontario on March 29, 1873; two years after his cousin's death. In a 1997 book, Dr. Lori Chambers observed that the Act was a "remedial measure intended for women's protection, not their emancipation." However, the Act "allowed some women scope to participate actively in the burgeoning economy of the province." Prior to the Act's passage into law, The Toronto Mail warned of the "dangers" posed by the Act; adding, "We have now only to hope that the good sense of the married women of Ontario will neutralize the Quixotic zeal of Mr. Crooks."

== Legacy ==
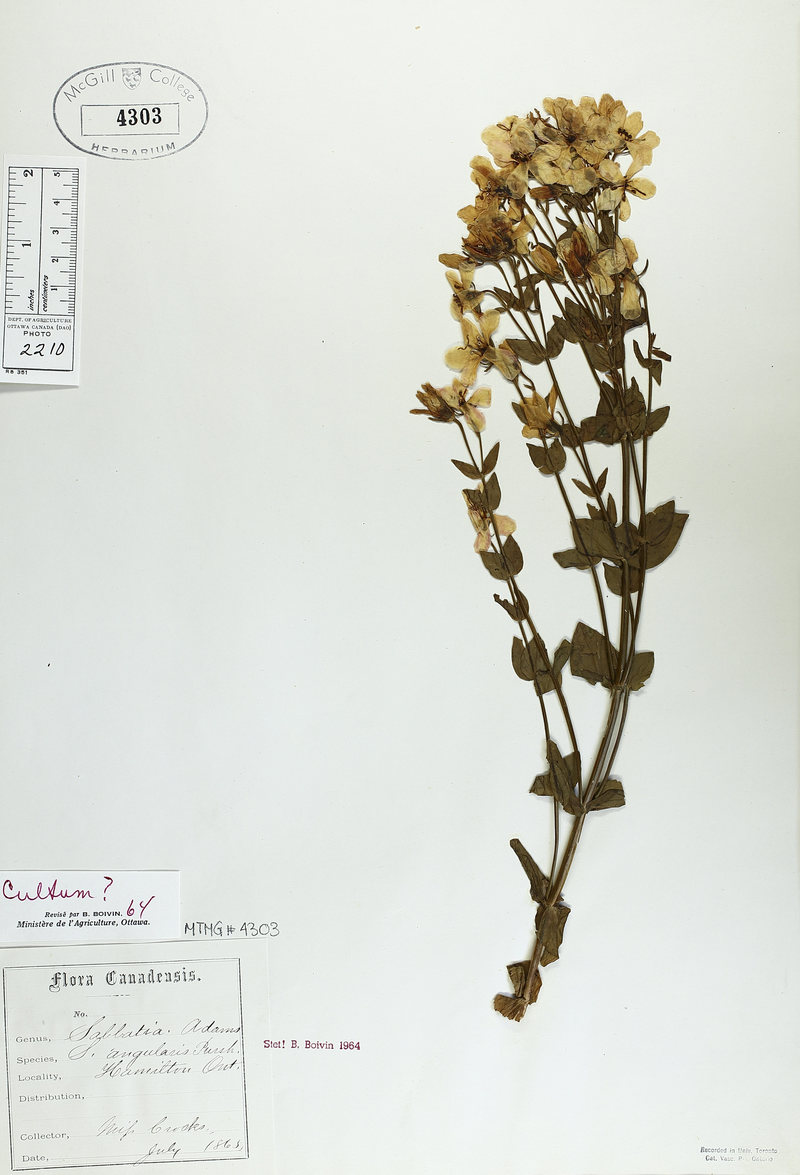
A specimen of Sabatia angularis, collected in 1865 by Miss Crooks. Courtesy of Dr. Frieda Beauregard, McGill University Herbarium.

One of Kate Crooks' pressed botanical specimens is held at the herbarium at McGill University, in Montreal, Quebec. This specimen, Sabatia angularis (L.) Pursh, was collected in Hamilton, Ontario in July 1865. It is the only known collection of this species in Ontario, as the plant is now considered extirpated in the region. It is not known if any other specimens prepared by Kate Crooks have survived the 150 years since her death.

Crooks' botanical records have been cited in the following publications:

- Argus, George W, and David J. White. Atlas of the Rare Vascular Plants of Ontario =: Atlas Des Plantes Vasculaires Rares De L'ontario. Ottawa, Ont: Botany Division, National Museum of Natural Sciences, 1982. https://doi.org/10.5962/bhl.title.51429
- Day, David F. The Plants of Buffalo and Its Vicinity. Baker, Jones & Co., 1882.
- Dickson, J. M., and A. Alexander. “Flora of Hamilton District.” Journal and Proceedings of the Hamilton Association, vols. 10-15, 1894, pp. 95–127.
- Gibson, John, and James M. Macoun. “Monograph of the Canadian Caryophyllaceae, as Represented within the Valley of the St. Lawrence and Great Lakes by J. Gibson and J. Macoun.” 1890, pp. 1–19., doi:10.5962/bhl.title.40970.
- Macoun, James M. Catalogue of Canadian Plants. Vol. 1, Dawson Brothers, 1883.
- Macoun, James M. “Synopsis of the Flora of the Valley of the St. Lawrence and Great Lakes: With Descriptions of the Rarer Plants.” The Canadian Journal, vol. 15, no. 1, Apr. 1876, pp. 51–66.
