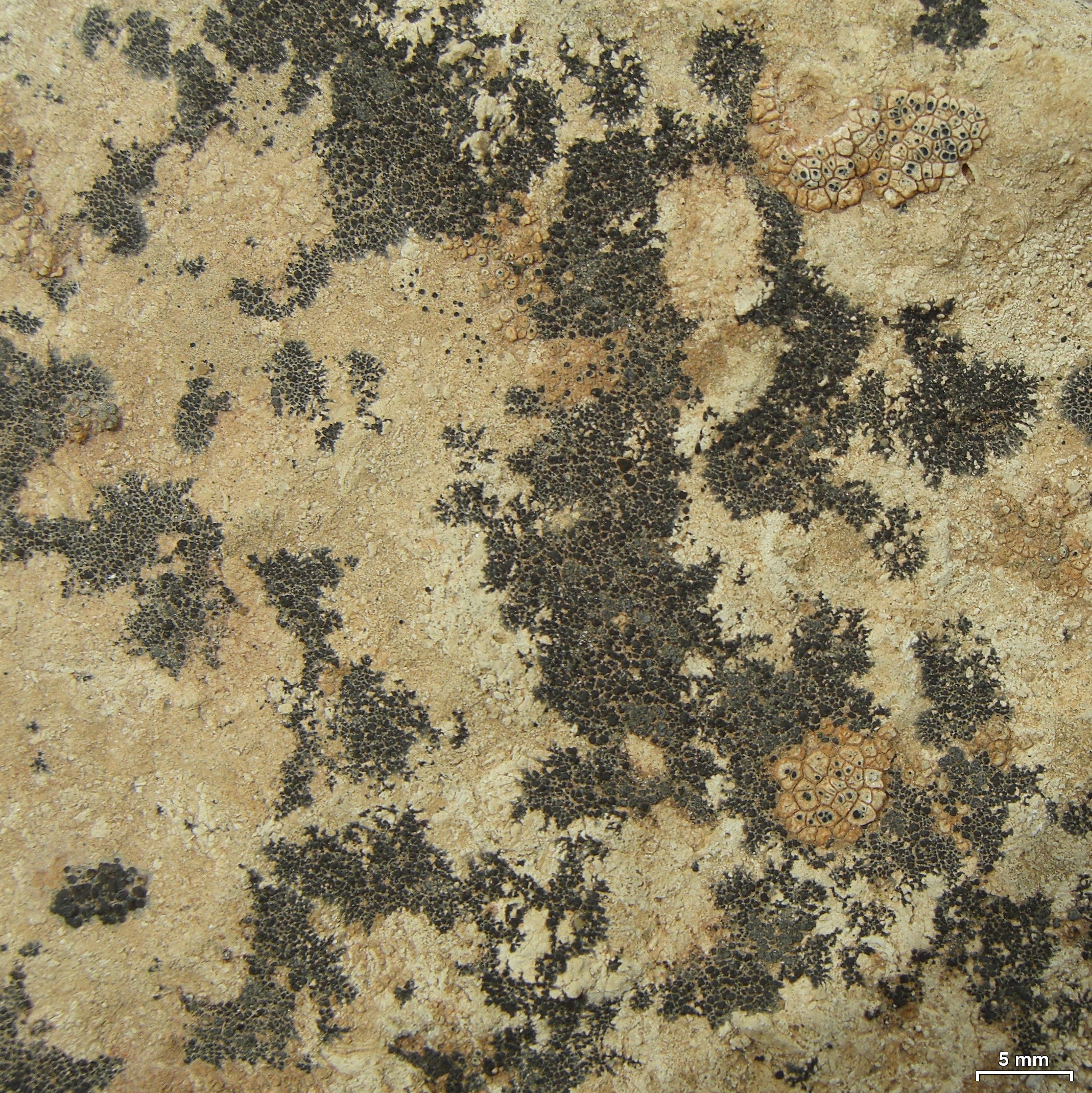

Conservation status
- Secure (NatureServe)

Scientific classification
- Kingdom: Fungi
- Division: Ascomycota
- Class: Eurotiomycetes
- Order: Verrucariales
- Family: Verrucariaceae
- Genus: Staurothele
- Species: S. drummondii

Binomial name
- Staurothele drummondii (Tuck.) Tuck. (1872)

Synonyms
- Verrucaria drummondii Tuck. (1866)

= Staurothele drummondii =

Species of lichen

Staurothele drummondii is a species of saxicolous (rock-dwelling) crustose lichen in the family Verrucariaceae. It is widespread in northern North America, but has also been recorded in Eurasia, Greenland, and Iran.

== Taxonomy ==
It was scientifically described as new to science in 1866 by the American lichenologist Edward Tuckerman, who initially classified it in the genus Verrucaria. The type specimen was collected near Kingston, Ontario (Canada), where it was found growing on limestone. Tuckerman noted the "small, rounded, thinnish, and very dark fronds are quite conspicuous on the light-gray rock, and are from a quarter to half an inch in diameter". The species epithet honours the collector, Andrew T. Drummond, a member of the Botanical Society of Canada. Several years later, Tuckerman transferred the taxon to the genus Staurothele.

== Description ==
The lichen has a brown to blackish-brown thallus with convex, marginal areoles. These areoles are small and rounded, measuring 0.2 to 0.7 mm in diameter. The fruiting bodies are in the form of perithecia, which have a conspicuous black involucrellum around the ostioles. The ascospores of Staurothele drummondii number two per ascus. They are brown and muriform (divided into multiple compartments by internal partitions), measuring 24–50 by 11–24 μm.

== Habitat and distribution ==
Although mainly found on rocks that are at least occasionally inundated with water, it sometimes occurs on dry limestone. It is widespread in both Canada and the western and northeastern United States. It has also been recorded in Eurasia, Greenland, and Iran.
