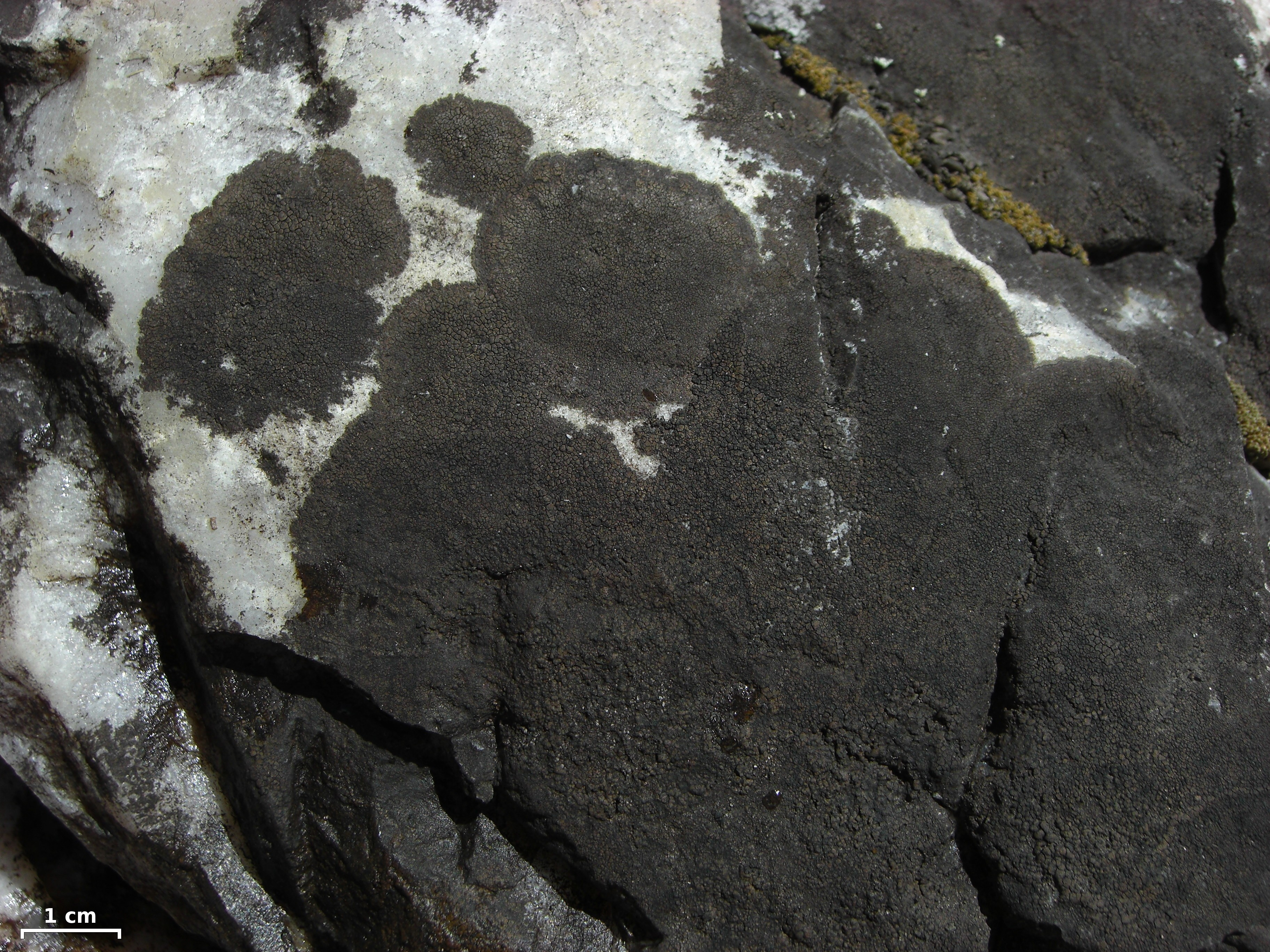

Conservation status
- Apparently Secure (NatureServe)

Scientific classification
- Domain: Eukaryota
- Kingdom: Fungi
- Division: Ascomycota
- Class: Eurotiomycetes
- Order: Verrucariales
- Family: Verrucariaceae
- Genus: Staurothele
- Species: S. fissa

Binomial name
- Staurothele fissa (Taylor) Zwackh (1862)

= Staurothele fissa =

Species of lichen-forming fungus

Staurothele fissa is a species of saxicolous (rock-dwelling), crustose lichen belonging to the family Verrucariaceae.

It has a cosmopolitan distribution.
