= Clavascidium sinense =

Scientific classification
- Domain: Eukaryota
- Kingdom: Fungi
- Division: Ascomycota
- Class: Eurotiomycetes
- Order: Verrucariales
- Family: Verrucariaceae
- Genus: Clavascidium
- Species: C. sinense

Binomial name
- Clavascidium sinense T.T.Zhang & X.L.Wei (2022)

Species of lichen

Clavascidium sinense is a species of squamulose (scaley), ground-dwelling lichen in the family Verrucariaceae. Found in Northwest China, it was formally described as a new species in 2022 by Tingting Zhang and Xinli Wei. The type specimen was collected in Datong City (Yanggao County, Shanxi) at an altitude of 1,147 m (3,763 ft). The species epithet sinense refers to its Chinese distribution.

Characteristics of Clavascidium sinense include the presence of both uniseriate (lined up in a single row) and biseriate (lined up in two rows) ascospores in the asci, pycnidia that are superficial on the surface of the squamules (laminal), and mixed-type medulla (with both rounded and elongated cells). The lichen does not react with any of the standard chemical spot tests, and no lichen products were detected using thin-layer chromatography.
