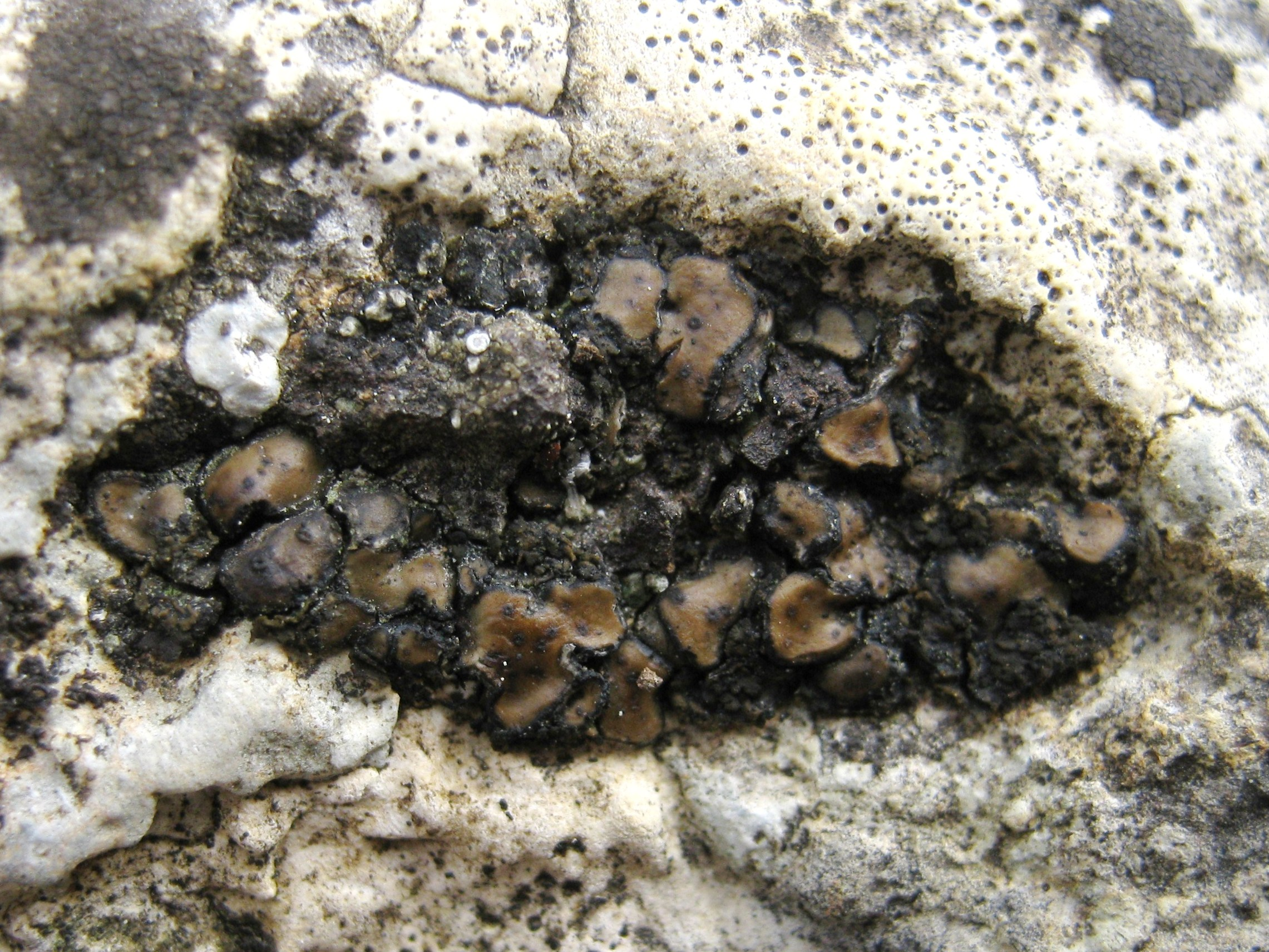
- Growing in a calcareous rock depression in Planalto das Cezaredas, Portugal

Scientific classification
- Kingdom: Fungi
- Division: Ascomycota
- Class: Eurotiomycetes
- Order: Verrucariales
- Family: Verrucariaceae
- Genus: Catapyrenium
- Species: C. boccanum

Binomial name
- Catapyrenium boccanum (Servít) Breuss (1990)

Synonyms
- Dermatocarpon boccanum Servít (1955); Placidium boccanum (Servít) Breuss (1996)

= Catapyrenium boccanum =

Species of lichen

Catapyrenium boccanum is a species of squamulose (scaley), rock-dwelling lichen in the family Verrucariaceae. It grows on mortar or on calcareous rock. Its squamules are up to 4 mm wide, pale to dark brown with black margins and a black underside. Ascospores measure 11–15 by 5–8 μm. Because of its combination of squamulose thallus, simple ascospores (without any septa), and lack of algae in the hymenium, this species is a "catapyrenioid" lichen, of which more than 80 exist in the Verrucariaceae.

== Taxonomy ==
The lichen was first formally described as a new species in 1955 by the Czech lichenologist Miroslav Servít. Othmar Breuss transferred it to Catapyrenium in 1990 as part of a revision of that genus.

== Description ==
Catapyrenium boccanum is a characterised by scattered to contiguous squamules (scale-like structures) that measure 2–4 mm across. These squamules are firmly attached to their substrate throughout most of their area, though they may have slightly upturned margins. They are irregularly circular (orbicular) or somewhat lobed in shape. The upper surface displays a brown colouration that can be matt or slightly glossy in appearance.

The lower thallus surface is distinctively black all the way to the margin, creating a visible dark rim around each squamule. The lower cortex (protective outer layer) consists of round to somewhat angular cells. The rhizoidal hyphae (fungal filaments that anchor the lichen) are colourless.

Reproductive structures of C. boccanum include immersed perithecia (flask-shaped fruiting bodies), with an exciple (outer wall) that is pale except around the ostiole (opening). The asci (spore-containing structures) are cylindrical in shape. The ascospores (sexual spores) measure 12–16 by 5.5–7.5 μm, are ellipsoidl in shape, and arranged in a single row (uniseriately).

The species also produces pycnidia (asexual fruiting bodies) that are laminal (situated on the surface) and immersed. These structures contain cylindric-ellipsoidal conidia (asexual spores) that are 3–4 μm in length.

== Habitat and distribution ==
In Europe, the lichen has a largely Mediterranean distribution, although scattered records are known from western and southern Europe. It is also found in Turkey. Catapyrenium boccanum is quite rare in the United Kingdom, known only from single collections that were made in South Devon and Somerset.
