= Clavascidium umbrinum =

Conservation status
- Vulnerable (NatureServe)

Scientific classification
- Domain: Eukaryota
- Kingdom: Fungi
- Division: Ascomycota
- Class: Eurotiomycetes
- Order: Verrucariales
- Family: Verrucariaceae
- Genus: Clavascidium
- Species: C. umbrinum

Binomial name
- Clavascidium umbrinum (Breuss) Breuss, 1996

Species of fungus

Clavascidium umbrinum, also known as Catapyrenium umbrinum, is a lichen. It is characteristically 2 to 4 millimeters wide and medium to dark brown found on soil.

Found in Europe and North America; rather rare in Arizona, California, Chihuahua and Baja California.
