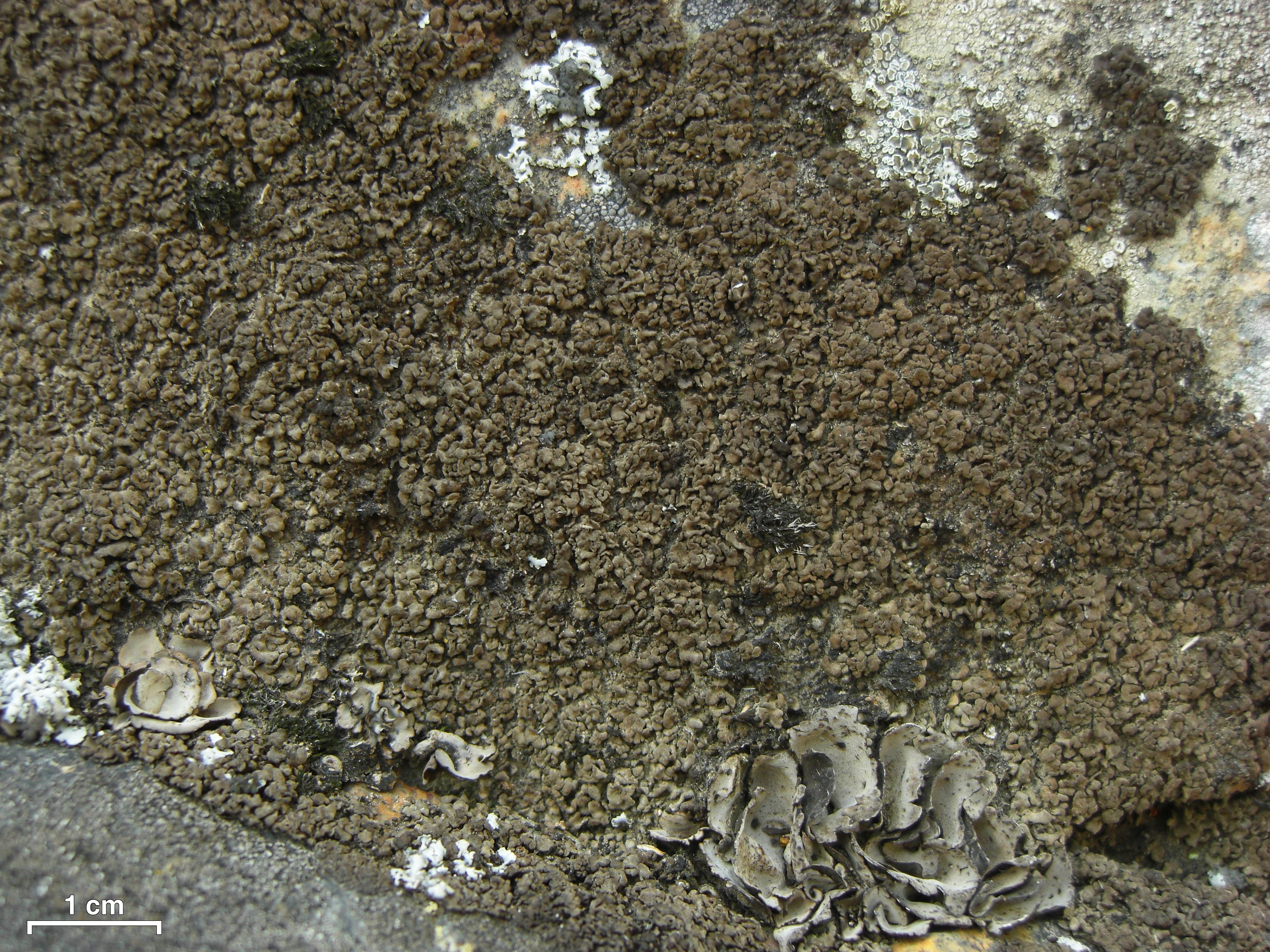

Conservation status
- Apparently Secure (NatureServe)

Scientific classification
- Kingdom: Fungi
- Division: Ascomycota
- Class: Eurotiomycetes
- Order: Verrucariales
- Family: Verrucariaceae
- Genus: Staurothele
- Species: S. pulvinata

Binomial name
- Staurothele pulvinata (Th.Fr.) Heiðm. (2017)

Synonyms
- Endocarpon pulvinatum Th.Fr. (1861); Dermatocarpon pulvinatum (Th.Fr.) Körb. (1863); Polyblastia pulvinata (Th.Fr.) Jatta (1900); Cornicularia mirabilis Lynge (1940); Pyrenothamnia spraguei Tuck. (1883); Endocarpon tortuosum Herre (1911)

= Staurothele pulvinata =

Species of lichen

Staurothele pulvinata is a species of saxicolous (rock-dwelling), squamulose lichen in the family Verrucariaceae. The lichen was first formally described in 1861 by Theodor Magnus Fries, as a member of genus Endocarpon. The type specimen was collected from northern Norway. The taxon was later transferred to Dermatocarpon by Gustav Wilhelm Körber in 1863, and to Polyblastia by Antonio Jatta in 1900. Starri Heiðmarsson moved it to Staurothele in 2017, based on molecular phylogenetic analysis that showed it belonged to that genus. It is one of few squamulose species in a genus comprising mostly crustose lichens. Staurothele pulvinata has an arctic-alpine distribution; it has been recorded from Europe, Greenland, Iceland, and the United States.
