= Placidium nigrum =

Scientific classification
- Domain: Eukaryota
- Kingdom: Fungi
- Division: Ascomycota
- Class: Eurotiomycetes
- Order: Verrucariales
- Family: Verrucariaceae
- Genus: Placidium
- Species: P. nigrum

Binomial name
- Placidium nigrum T.T.Zhang & X.L.Wei (2022)

Species of lichen

Placidium nigrum is a species of squamulose (scaley), ground-dwelling lichen in the family Verrucariaceae. It is found in Northwest China and the Tibetan Plateau, where it grows on sandy soil surfaces in semi-arid and arid regions.

The lichen was formally described as new to science in 2022 by Tingting Zhang and Xinli Wei. The type specimen was collected from the Da Qaidam (Haixi Mongol and Tibetan Autonomous Prefecture), at an altitude of 3,515 m (11,532 ft); it has since been collected at altitude ranges between 438 and 3,515 m (1,437 and 11,532 ft). The species epithet nigrum alludes to the black area surrounding the thallus that results from an aggregation of pycnidia (asexual fruiting bodies). These abundant, tiny pycnidia occur both superficially on the thallus surface (laminal) and on the lobe edges (marginal). Placidium nigrum does not react with any of the standard chemical spot tests, and no lichen products were detected from the species using thin-layer chromatography.
