= Clavascidium lacinulatum =

Conservation status
- Secure (NatureServe)

Scientific classification
- Kingdom: Fungi
- Division: Ascomycota
- Class: Eurotiomycetes
- Order: Verrucariales
- Family: Verrucariaceae
- Genus: Clavascidium
- Species: C. lacinulatum

Binomial name
- Clavascidium lacinulatum (Ach.) Prieto

Species of fungus

Clavascidium lacinulatum is a dark brown squamulous terricolous lichen. In Joshua Tree National Park, it is the most common of the biological soil crust lichens. It is notable for its ability to withstand UVC ultraviolet radiation for extended periods of time.
