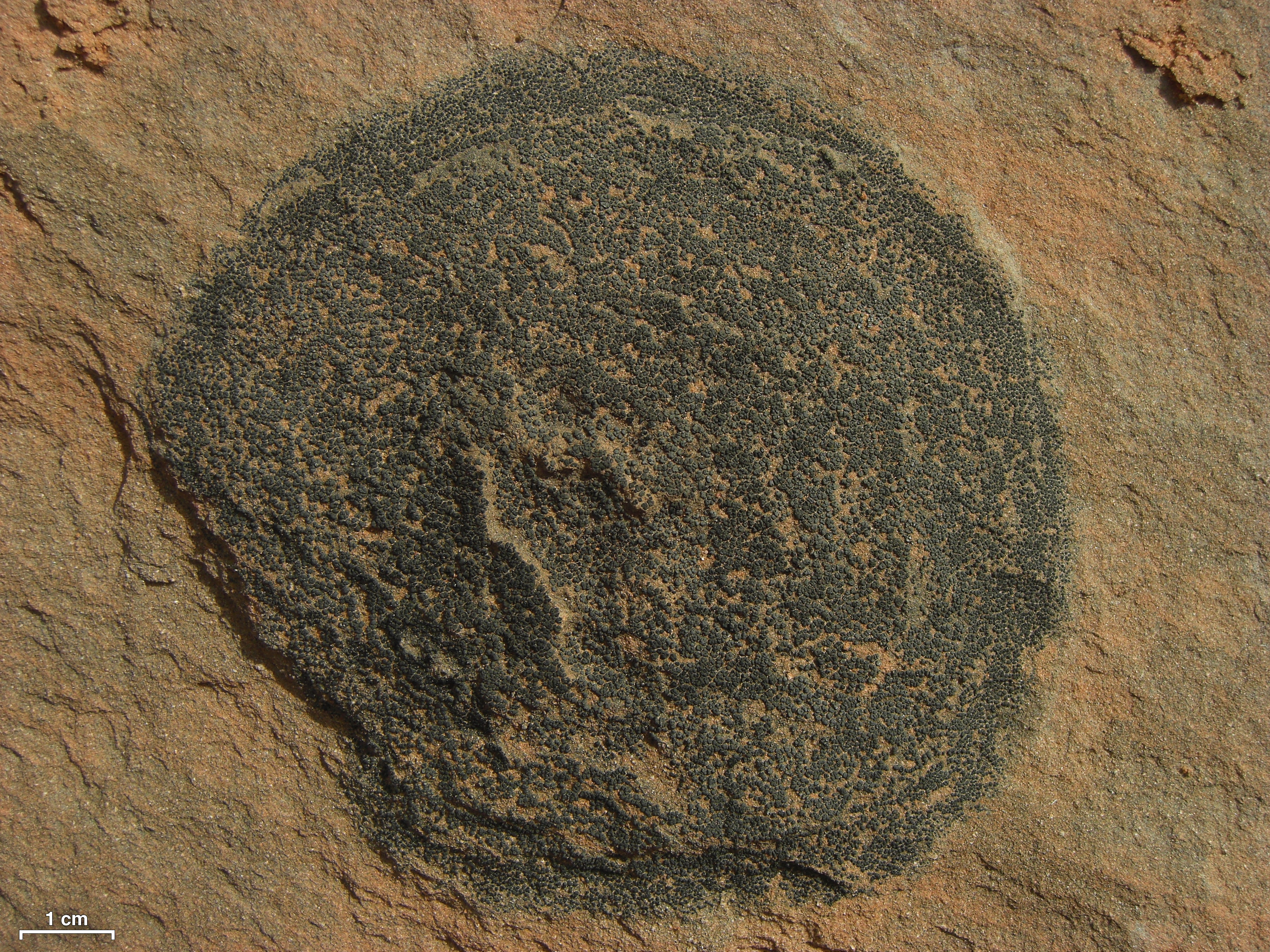
- On sandstone, near Canyonlands, Utah

Scientific classification
- Kingdom: Fungi
- Division: Ascomycota
- Class: Eurotiomycetes
- Order: Verrucariales
- Family: Verrucariaceae
- Genus: Staurothele
- Species: S. rugosa

Binomial name
- Staurothele rugosa J.W.Thomson (1991)

= Staurothele rugosa =

Species of lichen-forming fungus

Staurothele rugosa is a species of saxicolous (rock-dwelling) crustose lichen in the family Verrucariaceae. The species was first described in 1991 from specimens collected on sandstone at Dakota Ridge in Colorado. It forms a conspicuously rough, ashy gray crust made up of tightly packed, angular blocks that give the rock surface a corrugated, mosaic-like appearance. The lichen is found in the Rocky Mountain region of Colorado and Utah, growing on sandstone at elevations of around 5,400 to 6,000 feet.

== Taxonomy ==
Staurothele rugosa was described as a species by John W. Thomson in his 1991 revision of the North American species of Staurothele. This genus, which belongs to the family Verrucariaceae, comprises a group of crustose lichens with immersed perithecia and multi-celled (muriform) ascospores. The species was based on a type collection from Dakota Ridge, just southwest of Fort Collins in Larimer County, Colorado, where it was growing on sandstone of the Lytle Formation at 5,450 to 5,900 ft (1,660 to 1,800 m) elevation.

Thomson distinguished S. rugosa from other superficially similar species by the combination of its very roughened, ashy gray thallus and large brown ascospores. He contrasted it in particular with Staurothele lecideoides, which has smaller, tile-like areoles, a less strongly rugose surface, and much smaller, hyaline (colorless) spores, as well as with more typical Staurothele species that lack the conspicuously coarse, angular areoles that characterize S. rugosa.

== Description ==
Staurothele rugosa forms a crustose thallus made up of flat, angular areoles that are about 0.2–0.7 mm across. The upper surface of these areoles is ashy gray and conspicuously roughened, with a dense, finely powdered (pruinose) coating that is arranged in an angular pattern; under a lens this gives the surface an almost worm-like, corrugated appearance. The sides of the areoles are steep and black, so the thallus looks like a tightly packed mosaic of dark-edged blocks set into the rock surface.

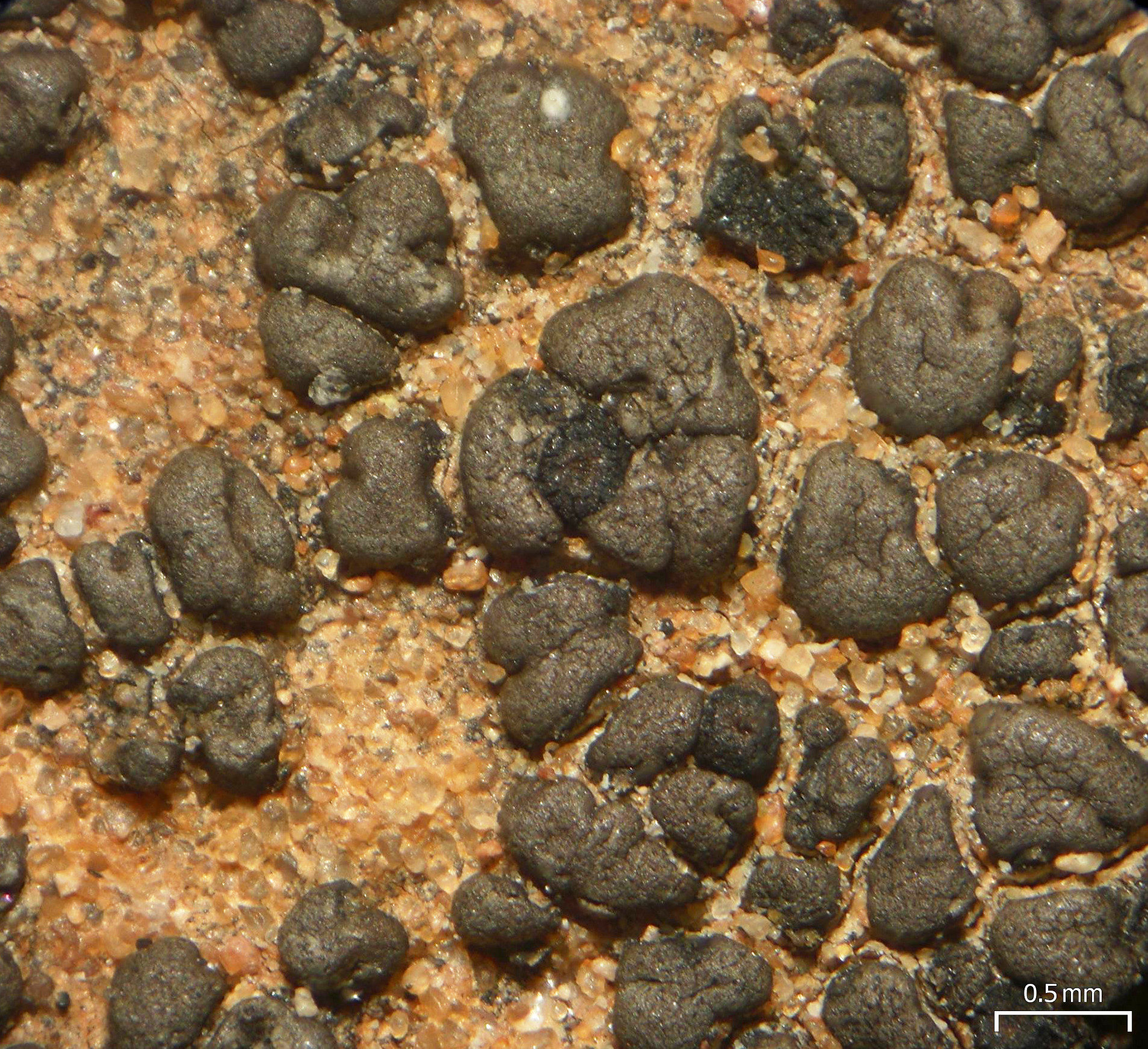
Close-up of coarse, dark gray areoles forming a rough crust on sandstone

The reproductive structures (perithecia) are completely immersed within the areoles, so that only the tiny opening (ostiole) is visible at the surface. Unlike some other Staurothele species, S. rugosa lacks a distinct, separate involucrellum (a dark outer wall around the perithecium); instead, the upper part of the perithecial wall (the exciple) is dark and becomes paler toward the base. Each ascus usually contains one or two spores. The ascospores are brown and muriform—divided by numerous transverse and longitudinal septa into many small, brick-like compartments—and are large for the genus, measuring about 52–70 × 35–37 μm.

== Habitat and distribution ==
The type collection of Staurothele rugosa was made on sandstone of the Lytle Formation on Dakota Ridge above Horsetooth Reservoir in Larimer County, Colorado, at an elevation of 5,450 to 5,900 ft (1,660 to 1,800 m). Thomson also cited additional material from Middle St. Vrain Creek in Rocky Mountain National Park and from near the Lyons Formation, both in the Colorado Front Range, as well as from the Ekker Ranch in Wayne County, Utah, around 6,000 ft (1,800 m) elevation. It is one of eight species of Staurothele that have been recorded in Utah, and one of 22 in North America.
