= Neocatapyrenium disparatum =

Scientific classification
- Domain: Eukaryota
- Kingdom: Fungi
- Division: Ascomycota
- Class: Eurotiomycetes
- Order: Verrucariales
- Family: Verrucariaceae
- Genus: Neocatapyrenium
- Species: N. disparatum

Binomial name
- Neocatapyrenium disparatum Breuss (2005)

Species of lichen

Neocatapyrenium disparatum is a species of squamulose lichen in the family Verrucariaceae. Found in the United States, the lichen was described as a new species in 2005 by Othmar Breuss. It is the only member of genus Neocatapyrenium that occurs outside of Eurasia. The type specimen was collected by Clifford Wetmore in a rocky valley in Big Bend National Park, Texas, at an elevation of 6,300 ft (1,900 m); here the lichen was discovered growing on moss over soil. It is only known to occur at the type locality. The specific epithet disparatum, meaning "separated", alludes to its similarity with and separation from the lookalike species Neocatapyrenium cladonioideum.
