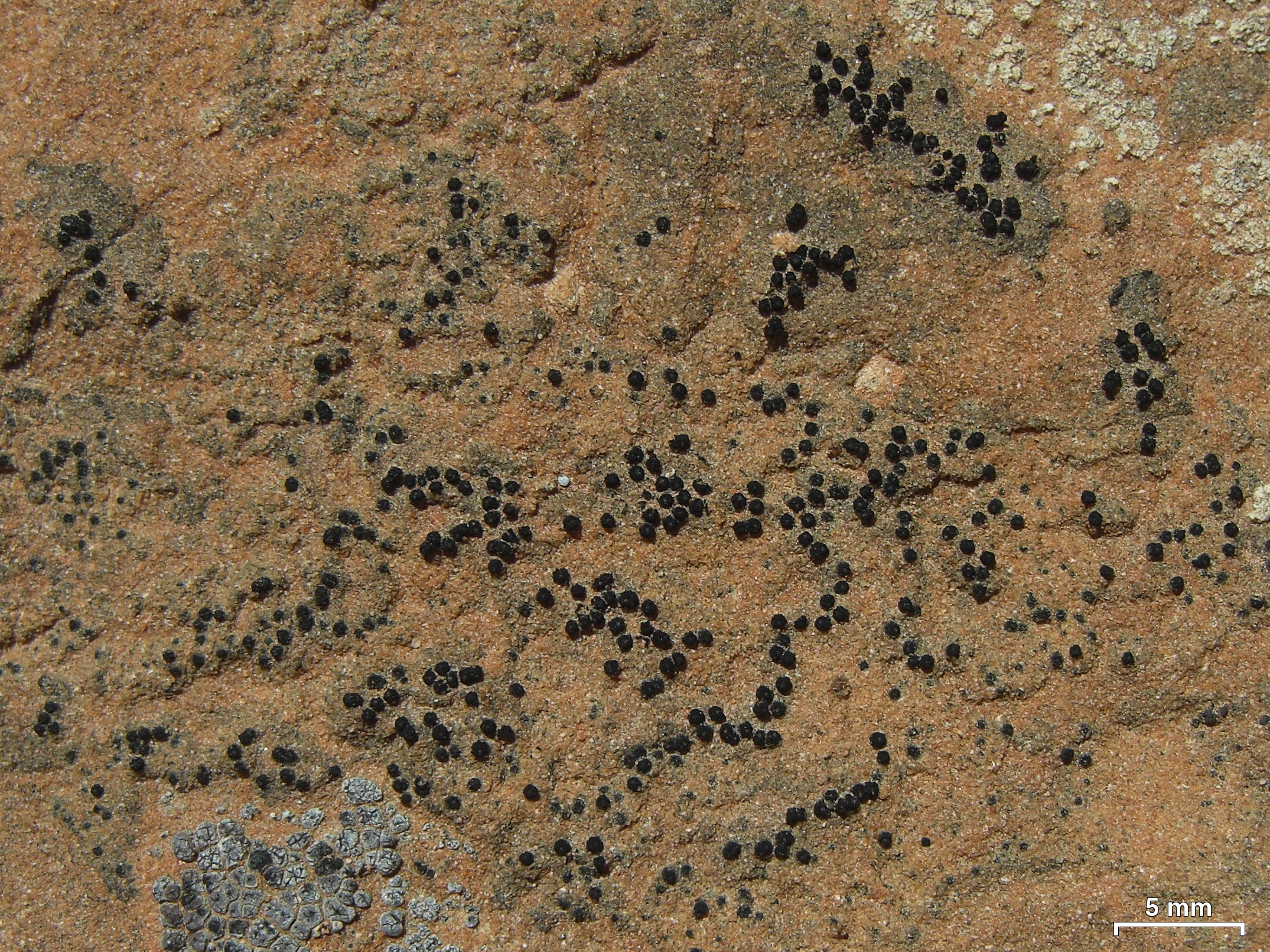
- Staurothele elenkinii

Scientific classification
- Domain: Eukaryota
- Kingdom: Fungi
- Division: Ascomycota
- Class: Eurotiomycetes
- Order: Verrucariales
- Family: Verrucariaceae
- Genus: Staurothele; Norman (1852)

Type species
- Staurothele clopima (Wahlenb.) Th.Fr. (1852)

Species
- See text

Synonyms
- Goidanichia Tomas. & Cif. (1952); Goidanichiomyces Cif. & Tomas. (1953); Paraphysorma A.Massal. (1852); Polyblastiomyces E.A.Thomas (1939); Sphaeromphale A.Massal. (1854); Stigmatomma Körb. (1855)

= Staurothele =

Genus of lichens

Staurothele is a genus of saxicolous (rock-dwelling), crustose lichens in the family Verrucariaceae. It has about 40 species. When the fungus is part of a lichen, the genus of lichen is commonly called rock pimples.

== Species ==
- Staurothele alboterrestris van den Boom & Etayo (2017)
- Staurothele ambrosiana (A.Massal.) Lettau (1914)
- Staurothele arctica Lynge (1937)
- Staurothele areolata (Ach.) Lettau (1912)
- Staurothele bacilligera (Arnold) Arnold (1885)
- Staurothele caesia (Arnold) Arnold (1885)
- Staurothele clopima (Wahlenb.) Th.Fr. (1861)
- Staurothele dendritica V.Wirth (2006)
- Staurothele desquamescens (Zahlbr.) Aptroot (2004)
- Staurothele drummondii (Tuck.) Tuck. (1872)
- Staurothele elenkinii Oxner (1927)
- Staurothele fissa (Taylor) Zwackh (1862)
- Staurothele frustulenta Vain. (1921)
- Staurothele geoica Zschacke (1919)
- Staurothele guestphalica (J.Lahm ex Körb.) Arnold (1885)
- Staurothele honghensis H.Harada & Li S.Wang (2006)
- Staurothele hymenogonia (Nyl.) Th.Fr. (1865)
- Staurothele nemorum C.A.Morse & Ladd (2019) – USA
- Staurothele oxneri S.Y.Kondr., Lőkös & Hur (2016)
- Staurothele pulvinata (Th.Fr.) Heiðm. (2017)
- Staurothele rufa (A.Massal.) Zschacke (1913)
- Staurothele rugosa J.W.Thomson (1991)
- Staurothele rugulosa (A.Massal.) Arnold (1897)
- Staurothele rupifraga (A.Massal.) Arnold (1881)
- Staurothele septentrionalis Lynge (1928)
- Staurothele succedens (Rehm) Arnold (1881)
