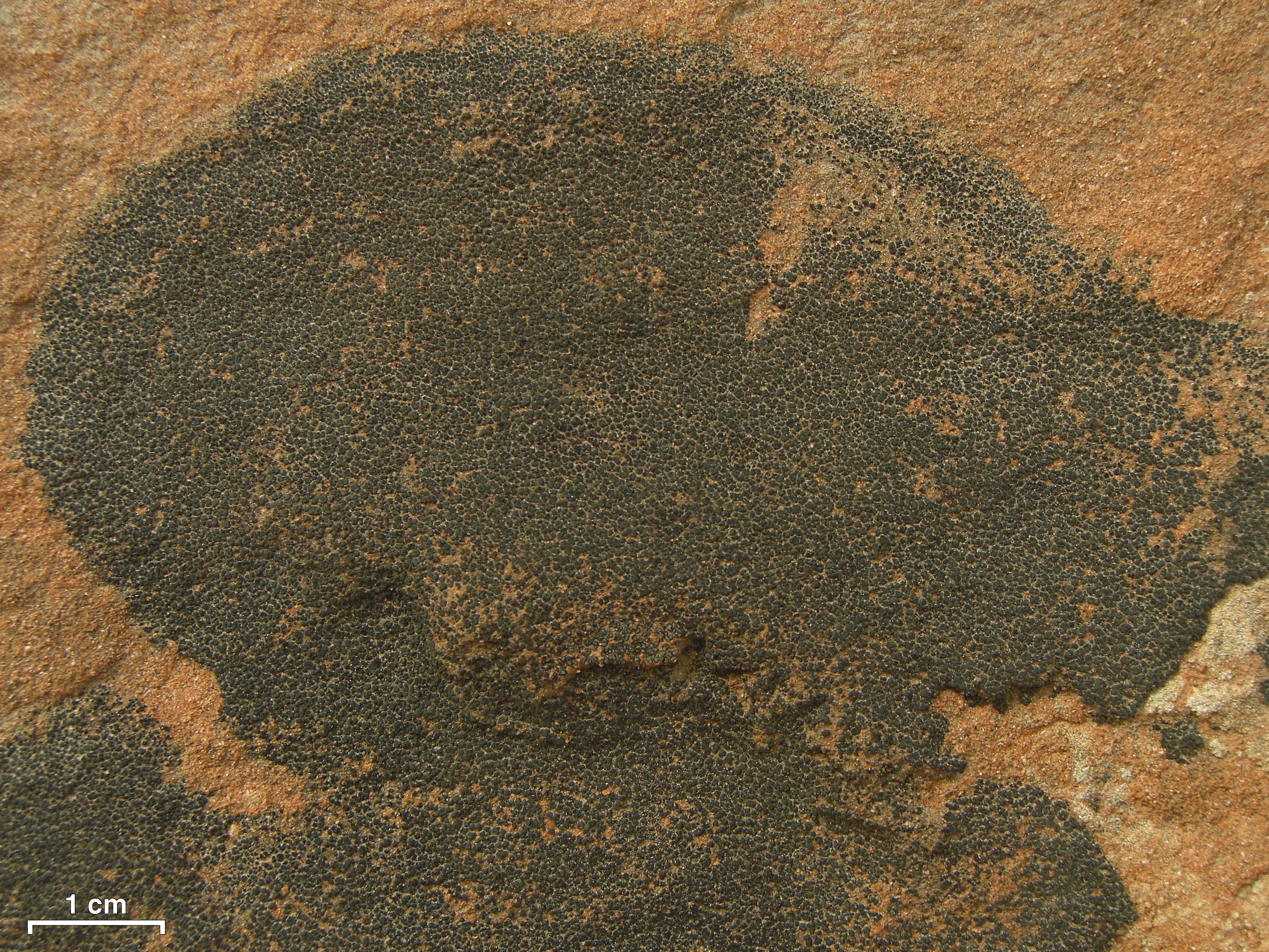
- on sandstone, near Canyonlands, Utah

Conservation status
- Apparently Secure (NatureServe)

Scientific classification
- Domain: Eukaryota
- Kingdom: Fungi
- Division: Ascomycota
- Class: Eurotiomycetes
- Order: Verrucariales
- Family: Verrucariaceae
- Genus: Staurothele
- Species: S. areolata

Binomial name
- Staurothele areolata (Ach.) Lettau (1912)

Synonyms
- Pyrenula areolata Ach. (1814)

= Staurothele areolata =

Species of lihen

Staurothele areolata is blackish-brown crustose lichen in the family Verrucariaceae. It is found in western North America.

== Habitat and range ==
It is found in mountains of western North America up to 3,600 metres (11,800 ft), and in Sonoran Desert in Mexico and in Arizona, where it is common. In Southern California, it is less common, and is found on outcrops of limestone, gneiss, schist, and sandstone. It is found on acid or basic rocks, near water. It is found in the mountains of the United States Sierra Nevada range.

== Description ==
The thallus is crustose with deeply cracked areoles.
