= Staurothele nemorum =

Scientific classification
- Kingdom: Fungi
- Division: Ascomycota
- Class: Eurotiomycetes
- Order: Verrucariales
- Family: Verrucariaceae
- Genus: Staurothele
- Species: S. nemorum

Binomial name
- Staurothele nemorum C.A.Morse & Ladd (2019)

Species of lichen-forming fungus

Staurothele nemorum is a species of saxicolous (rock-dwelling) lichen in the family Verrucariaceae. Found in the United States, it was formally described as a new species in 2019 by Caleb Morse and Douglas Ladd. The type specimen was collected from the University of Kansas Ecological Reserves, in Baldwin City, Kansas. The species epithetnemorum, which combines the Latin roots nemus (grove or a glade) and -oris, alludes to the habitat of this lichen. It occurs in the southern Great Plains in central North America, and has been collected in the states of Kansas, Missouri, Oklahoma, and Texas. It prefers dry sites, often on south- and west-facing exposures, where it grows on pebbles and cobbles of limestone and calcareous sandstone.
