= Clavascidium =

Scientific classification
- Domain: Eukaryota
- Kingdom: Fungi
- Division: Ascomycota
- Class: Eurotiomycetes
- Order: Verrucariales
- Family: Verrucariaceae
- Genus: Clavascidium; Breuss (1996)

Type species
- Clavascidium umbrinum (Breuss) Breuss (1996)

Species
- C. antillarum C. imitans C. kisovense C. krylovianum C. lacinulatum C. pseudorufescens C. semaforonense

Genus of lichens

Clavascidium is a genus of lichens in the family Verrucariaceae. The genus was circumscribed in 1996 by Austrian lichenologist Othmar Breuss. Because the type species of the genus, Clavascidium umbrinum, has been shown using molecular phylogenetics to belong to genus Placidium, Cécile Gueidan and colleagues proposed to unite Clavascidium with Placidium in a 2009 publication. Despite this, the genus has been retained in recent publications of fungal classification.

== Species ==
- Clavascidium antillarum (Breuss) Breuss (1996)
- Clavascidium imitans (Breuss) M.Prieto (2012)
- Clavascidium kisovense (Zahlbr.) Breuss (1996)
- Clavascidium krylovianum (Tomin) M.Prieto (2012)
- Clavascidium lacinulatum (Ach.) M.Prieto (2012)
- Clavascidium pseudorufescens (Breuss) M.Prieto (2012)
- Clavascidium semaforonense (Breuss) M.Prieto (2012)
- Clavascidium sinense T.T.Zhang & X.L.Wei (2022) – China

A couple of species once proposed for inclusion in this genus are now classified in other genera:

- Clavascidium liratum (Breuss) Breuss (1996) is now Anthracocarpon virescens
- Clavascidium umbrinum (Breuss) Breuss (1996) is now Placidium umbrinum.

A proposed generic transfer of Catapyrenium alvarense Breuss (1994) to Clavascidium in 2017 was invalidly published according to nomenclatural rules.
