= Neocatapyrenium =

Scientific classification
- Kingdom: Fungi
- Division: Ascomycota
- Class: Eurotiomycetes
- Order: Verrucariales
- Family: Verrucariaceae
- Genus: Neocatapyrenium; H.Harada (1993)

Type species
- Neocatapyrenium cladonioideum (Vain.) H.Harada (1993)

Species
- N. cladonioideum N. disparatum N. latzelii N. radicescens N. rhizinosum

Genus of lichens

Neocatapyrenium is a genus of squamulose lichens in the family Verrucariaceae. It has five species. The genus was circumscribed by Hiroshi Harada in 1993, with Neocatapyrenium cladonioideum assigned as the type species.

== Species ==
- Neocatapyrenium cladonioideum (Vain.) H.Harada (1993)
- Neocatapyrenium disparatum Breuss (2005)
- Neocatapyrenium latzelii (Zahlbr.) Breuss (1996)
- Neocatapyrenium radicescens (Nyl.) Breuss (1996)
- Neocatapyrenium rhizinosum (Müll.Arg.) Breuss (1996)
