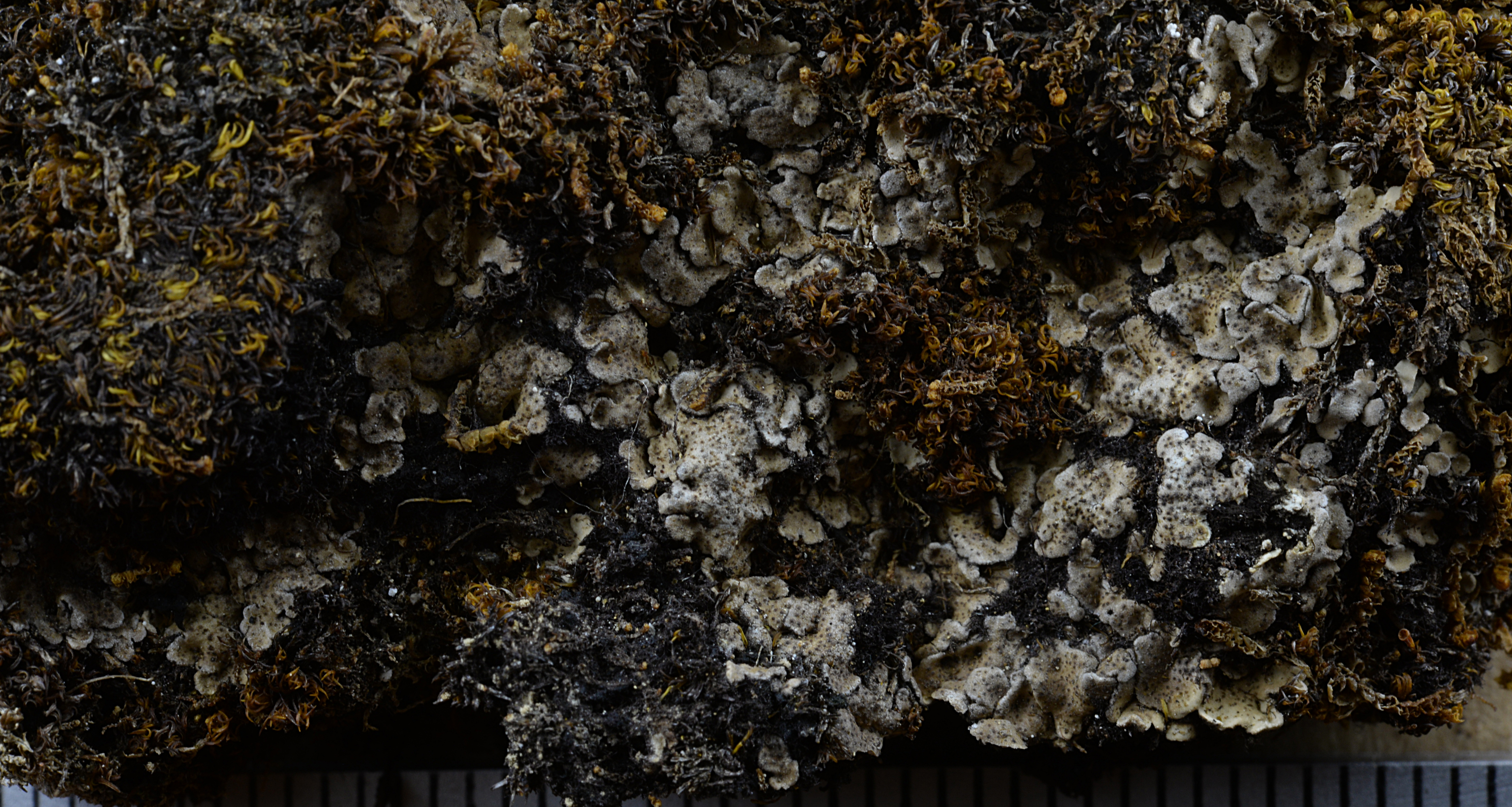
- Catapyrenium daedaleum

Scientific classification
- Domain: Eukaryota
- Kingdom: Fungi
- Division: Ascomycota
- Class: Eurotiomycetes
- Order: Verrucariales
- Family: Verrucariaceae
- Genus: Catapyrenium; Flot. (1850)

Type species
- Catapyrenium cinereum (Pers.) Körb. (1855)

Species
- See text

Synonyms
- Catapyrenium Flot. (1849); Endopyrenium Flot. (1855); Involucrocarpon Servít (1953); Dermatocarpella H.Harada (1993); Clavascidium Breuss (1996)

= Catapyrenium =

Genus of lichens

Catapyrenium is a genus of squamulose lichens in the family Verrucariaceae. These small lichens grow as clusters of tiny scales (squamules that lie flat against rocks and soil, often in dry or disturbed habitats. The genus includes about 18 species found worldwide, particularly in arid and semi-arid regions where they help stabilize soil surfaces.

== Taxonomy ==
The genus was circumscribed by the German botanist Julius von Flotow in 1850. He assigned Catapyrenium cinereum as the type species.

== Description ==
Catapyrenium species form a low, scale-like lichen body (thallus) composed of numerous minute lobes (squamules) that hug the rock or soil surface. Each squamule is anchored by a felt of fine, root-like fungal threads (rhizoidal hyphae) that may be colourless or tinged brown. The upper skin (cortex) is thin—about 10–30 micrometres (μm)—and uneven, merging almost imperceptibly with the underlying green-algal layer. This cortex is built from tiny, angular fungal cells only 5–8 μm across. A distinct lower cortex is variably developed: in some species it comprises similar small cells, while in others it is absent and the hyphae blend directly into the substrate. The photosynthetic partner is a unicellular green alga of the genus Diplosphaera (class Trebouxiophyceae).

Reproduction takes place in tiny, flask-shaped fruiting bodies (perithecia) that are buried within the thallus. Unlike many relatives, Catapyrenium lacks an involucrellum—the outer dark cap that often overarches perithecia—so the perithecial wall (true exciple) alone forms the enclosure. This wall consists of elongated cells arranged parallel to the surface and is typically darkened around the pore (ostiole) where spores are released, while the lower portion remains pale to slightly dark. Inside, only short ostiolar threads (periphyses) are present; the longer sterile filaments (paraphyses) found in many lichen fungi are absent. Each club-shaped ascus contains eight colourless, single-celled ascospores that line up in two rows (biseriate) and are broadly ellipsoidal to ovoid-club-shaped. No specialised asexual structures (conidiomata) have been observed, and chemical screening with thin-layer chromatography has yet to reveal any secondary metabolites.

== Species ==
- Catapyrenium adami-borosi (Szatala) Breuss (1987)
- Catapyrenium boccanum (Servít) Breuss (1990)
- Catapyrenium chilense (Räsänen) Breuss (1993)
- Catapyrenium cinereum (Pers.) Körb. (1855)
- Catapyrenium dactylinum Breuss (2000)
- Catapyrenium daedaleum (Körb.) Stein (1879)
- Catapyrenium fuscatum (Szatala) S.Y.Kondr. (2002)
- Catapyrenium lachneum (Ach.) R.Sant. (1980)
- Catapyrenium lambii (Oxner) Kudratov (2002)
- Catapyrenium michelii (A.Massal.) R.Sant. (1980)
- Catapyrenium oxneri (Akramova) Kudratov (2002)
- Catapyrenium pamiricum (N.S.Golubk.) Kudratov (2002)
- Catapyrenium pilosellum Breuss (1990)
- Catapyrenium psoromoides (Borrer) R.Sant. (1980)
- Catapyrenium rufescens (Ach.) Breuss (1985)
- Catapyrenium simulans Breuss (2002)
- Catapyrenium squamellum (Nyl. ex Hasse) J.W.Thomson (1987)
- Catapyrenium squamulosum (Ach.) Breuss (1985)
