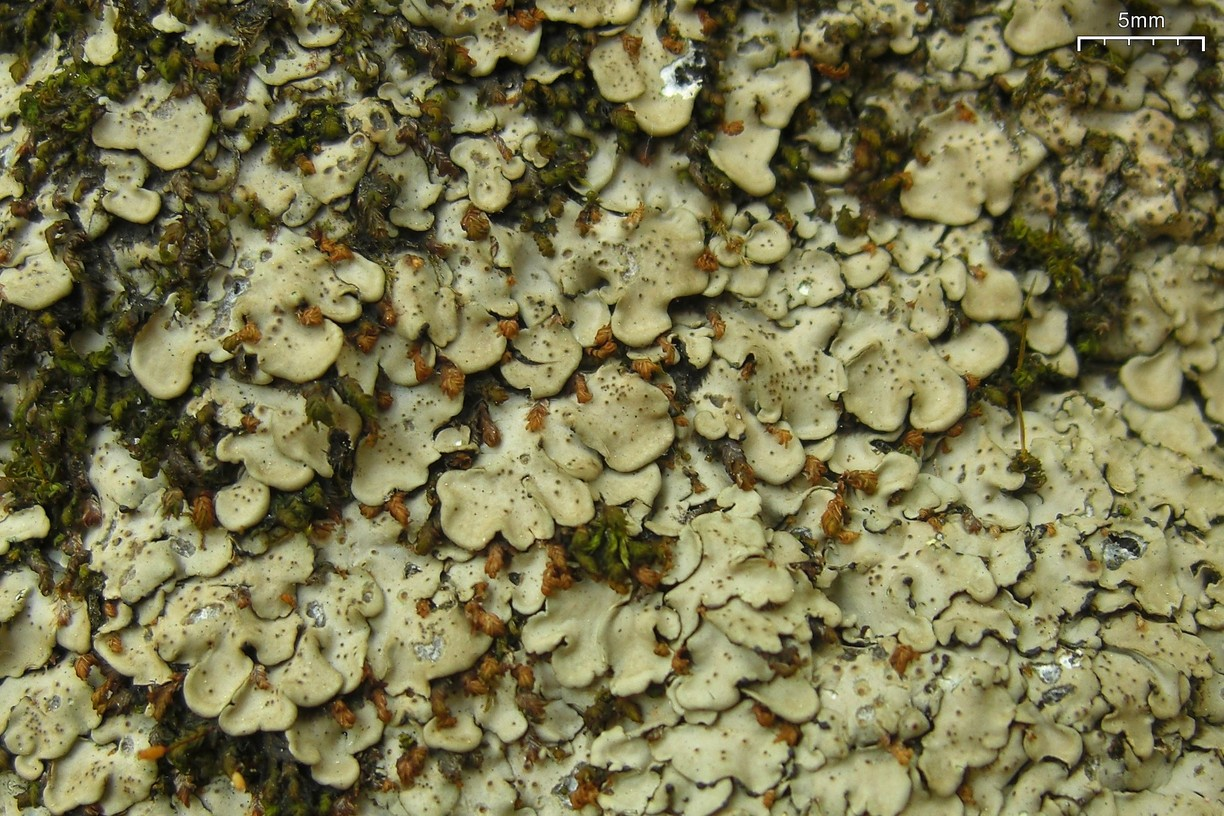
- Placidium arboreum

Scientific classification
- Domain: Eukaryota
- Kingdom: Fungi
- Division: Ascomycota
- Class: Eurotiomycetes
- Order: Verrucariales
- Family: Verrucariaceae
- Genus: Placidium; A.Massal. (1855)

Type species
- Placidium michelii A.Massal. (1856)

= Placidium =

Genus of lichens

Placidium is a genus of crustose to squamulose to almost foliose lichens. The genus is in the family Verrucariaceae. Most members grow on soil (are terricolous), but some grow on rock (saxicolous). The fruiting bodies are perithecia, flask-like structures immersed in the lichen body (thallus) with only the top opening visible, dotting the thallus. Lichen spot tests are all negative. Members of the genus lack rhizines, but otherwise resemble members of the genus Clavascidium.

Members of the genus are commonly called stiplescale lichens or earthscale.

== Taxonomy ==
The genus was circumscribed in 1855 by Italian lichenologist Abramo Bartolommeo Massalongo.

María Prieto and Ibai Olariaga suggest that Placidium is a superfluous illegitimate name according to strict application of nomenclatural rules. This is because when Massalongo circumscribed the genus in 1855, he included the original type species of genus Endocarpon, E. pusillum. When Othmar Breuss resurrected the genus for use in 1996, he assigned P. michelii as its type, even though Massalongo did not include P. michelii in Placidium in his original 1855 circumscription, but rather in a later treatment of the genus. In 2019, Prieto and Olariaga submitted a proposal to conserve the name Placidium with Placidium michelii as its conserved type species.

== Species ==
- Placidium arboreum (Schwein. ex E. Michener) Lendemer (2004)
- Placidium californicum Breuss (2000) – USA
- Placidium lesdainii Breuss (2002)
- Placidium nigrum T.T.Zhang & X.L.Wei (2022) – China
- Placidium nitidulum T.T.Zhang & X.L.Wei (2022) – China
- Placidium podolepis (Breuss) M.Prieto (2012)
- Placidium umbrinum (Breuss) M.Prieto & Breuss (2009)
- Placidium varium T.T.Zhang & X.L.Wei (2022) – China
- Placidium yoshimurae (H.Harada) Breuss (1996)
