= Botanical Society of Canada =

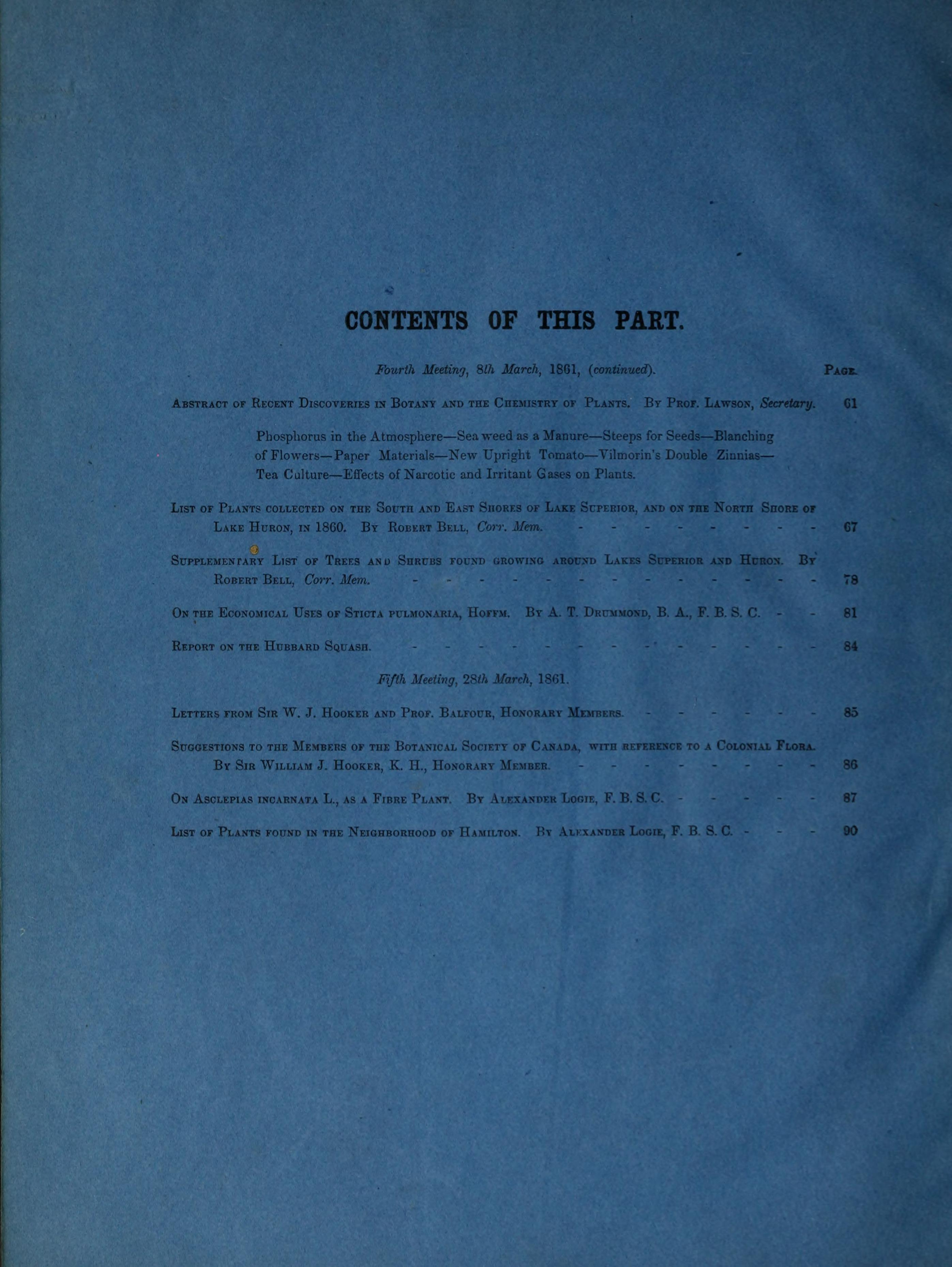
Table of Contents from the Annals of the Botanical Society of Canada

The Botanical Society of Canada was founded in Kingston, Ontario, Canada, in November 1860. Among its founding members was Scottish-Canadian botanist George Lawson, who created the Society with the goal of establishing a botanical garden at Queen's College (now Queen's University), and publishing a catalogue of Canadian plants.

== Membership ==
The Society's first meeting attracted 91 members. By the second meeting, held in January 1861, the Society had 140 paying members, including John A. Macdonald (who would later become Canada's first Prime Minister). William Leitch, the principal of Queen's College, was elected president, while Lawson became the Society's secretary.

200 people attended the Society's third meeting, and by this time, the Society began earning favourable notices from abroad. From its beginnings, the Botanical Society of Canada had practical and theoretical purposes. Members created a library and herbarium, and shared seeds and plant cuttings at their meetings. Farmers received advice on dealing with pests. One member, Andrew T. Drummond, published a report on plants which could be used for paper, and exhibited dyes made from lichens. Drummond and other members prepared floras of Kingston, southwestern Ontario, and the Red River region in Manitoba.

“Botanical [research] of great value had been carried out by ladies in other countries and all other departments of scientific knowledge had benefitted from their exertions.” – Annals of the Botanical Society of Canada, p. 52

The Society had five categories of membership; Honorary Members, Fellows, Lady Members, Annual Subscribers, and Corresponding Members. Several notable Honorary Members were admitted; including Asa Gray, Sir William Jackson Hooker, John Lindley, and John Torrey. Women were granted equal membership, and the Society's Annals contain several references to the work of its female members. For example, Mrs. Lawson, the wife of George Lawson, published a paper on silkworm cultivation. She argued that silkworm cultivation could be a productive form of employment for women and girls, while the silkworm's primary food source, the White Mulberry (Morus alba), would be an attractive addition to the urban landscape. Another member, a Miss Gildersleeve, followed-up on Mrs. Lawson's research with her own paper, 'Remarks on the silk obtained from lettuce-fed silkworms'.

== Botanical Garden ==
As part of the Society's mission, a botanical garden was established on the grounds at Summerhill, on Queen's College campus. The garden beds contained hardy plant species, including plants received from the Society's international members, such as Asa Gray. Lawson and others had hoped to install a greenhouse on the grounds, so that plants from warmer climates could thrive in the garden. The garden is sometimes referred to as the first botanical garden in Canada, but was preceded by at least one; Allan Gardens in Toronto. Today, Summerhill is the site of Queen's University's arboretum, but stray specimens from the old botanical garden are said to appear unexpectedly in the lawn.

== Dissolution ==
Despite ambitious beginnings, the Botanical Society of Canada was short-lived. In October 1863 George Lawson resigned from Queen's after clashing with Queen's College administration and at least one colleague. Lawson immediately left for Halifax, Nova Scotia, where he had been appointed professor of chemistry and mineralogy at the Dalhousie College (now Dalhousie University). Since the Botanical Society of Canada had relied on Lawson's social and professional connections, it collapsed after his departure. In 1867, former members of the Botanical Society of Canada attempted to revive the Society; proposing new branches throughout the country.
