= Pyrenula aurantiacorubra =

Scientific classification
- Kingdom: Fungi
- Division: Ascomycota
- Class: Eurotiomycetes
- Order: Pyrenulales
- Family: Pyrenulaceae
- Genus: Pyrenula
- Species: P. aurantiacorubra

Binomial name
- Pyrenula aurantiacorubra Aptroot & M.Cáceres (2014)
- Holotype: Serra do Machado, Brazil

Species of lichen

Pyrenula aurantiacorubra is a species of corticolous (bark-dwelling), crustose lichen in the family Pyrenulaceae. Found in Brazil, this species is characterised by its distinctive orange-red thallus (the main body of the lichen). Its ascospores are muriform, meaning they have multiple chambers, and are 3 (occasionally up to 5) by 1–2-septate, measuring 9–18 μm by 5–10 μm.

The type specimen of Pyrenula aurantiacorubra was collected from Serra do Machado in Ribeirópolis, Sergipe, Brazil, at an elevation of approximately 250 m (820 ft). The thallus is thin, somewhat granular, and orange-red mottled with grey. It lacks pseudocyphellae, which are small pores on the surface, and does not have a prothallus (a border around the thallus). The ascomata (fruiting bodies) are superficial (situated on the surface), globose (roughly spherical), 0.2–0.35 mm in diameter, and generally brown with an orange-red powdery coating, the pruina. The wall of the ascomata is barely carbonised (blackened). The ostiole, or opening, is apical and black. The hamathecium, the tissue between the asci, is not inspersed (does not contain oil droplets). The ascospores are arranged irregularly in the asci, brown, and muriform, with mostly rounded internal cavities.

Pyrenula aurantiacorubra does not have pycnidia (small asexual fruiting bodies). Chemically, the pigment reacts with potassium hydroxide (K+) to produce a deep crimson colour and shows an orange reaction under UV light. Thin-layer chromatography has revealed several anthraquinones (a type of organic compound), including 7-chloroemodin as the major compound, with one or more derivatives as minor compounds.

Pyrenula aurantiacorubra grows on smooth bark in disturbed Atlantic rainforests and is currently only known from Brazil. It is distinguished from other species by its striking orange-red thallus. In the field, it was recognised as a new species due to its distinctive appearance, even before detailed scientific analysis. It is similar to Pyrenula ochraceoflava, which grows in the same location but has a yellow-orange thallus. Unlike P. aurantiacorubra, P. ochraceoflava only contains 7-chloroemodin as its major compound.

== See also ==
- List of Pyrenula species
