= Pyrenula quartzitica =

Scientific classification
- Kingdom: Fungi
- Division: Ascomycota
- Class: Eurotiomycetes
- Order: Pyrenulales
- Family: Pyrenulaceae
- Genus: Pyrenula
- Species: P. quartzitica

Binomial name
- Pyrenula quartzitica Aptroot (2002)

Species of lichen

Pyrenula quartzitica is a species of crustose lichen belonging to the family Pyrenulaceae, described as a new species in 2002. Found in southeast Brazil, it is saxicolous, primarily growing on quartzitic and sandstone rock surfaces in forested areas.

== Taxonomy ==
Described by the Dutch lichenologist André Aptroot in 2002, Pyrenula quarztitica was first identified from specimens he collected five years prior from the Serra do Caraça in Minas Gerais, Brazil. This species is distinguished by its reddish-brown ostioles and its similarity in ascospore characteristics to the genus Pyrgillus. The species epithet quartzitica refers to the rock substrate it grows on. In the protologue the species epithet was introduced as "quarzitica". This spelling has since been treated as an orthographic variant and corrected to "quartzitica" in later usage and in taxonomic databases, which list the name as Pyrenula quartzitica Aptroot.

== Description ==
The thallus of Pyrenula quartzitica is crustose, extending up to 10 cm in diameter, with a yellowish-brown colouration, and a somewhat glossy appearance without pseudocyphellae or a visible hypothallus. It hosts sparse Trentepohlia-like green algae and is primarily corticate.

Perithecia (fruiting bodies) are mostly hemispherical, partially enveloped by the thallus, and brown, measuring between 0.6 and 1.0 mm in diameter. The ascomal wall is substantial, lined with angular hyaline (translucent) crystals that react reddish with potassium hydroxide solution. The ostiole at the centre appears conical and reddish-brown.

The hymenium is clear and IKI-negative, lacking any dispersed oil globules. Asci are cylindrical to clavate (club-shaped), measuring about 100–150 by 15–20 μm. Paraphyses are simple, with a few anastomosing above the asci. Ascospores are dark chocolate brown, arranged uniseriately within the ascus, ellipsoid with pointed ends, and show distoseptate division with enhanced pigmentation around the septa.

== Habitat and distribution ==
Pyrenula quarztitica is known only from the Serra do Caraça in Minas Gerais, southeastern Brazil, where it occupies both shaded and somewhat exposed quartzitic and sandstone substrates within forest remnants. Aptroot called it "the only really saxicolous species of Pyrenula".

== See also ==
- List of Pyrenula species
