= Pyrenula sexluminata =

Scientific classification
- Kingdom: Fungi
- Division: Ascomycota
- Class: Eurotiomycetes
- Order: Pyrenulales
- Family: Pyrenulaceae
- Genus: Pyrenula
- Species: P. sexluminata

Binomial name
- Pyrenula sexluminata Aptroot (2011)
- Holotype: Finisterre Range, Papua New Guinea

Synonyms
- Pyrenula quinqueseptata Aptroot (1997)

Species of lichen-forming fungus

Pyrenula sexluminata is a species of corticolous (bark-dwelling) crustose lichen in the family Pyrenulaceae. It occurs in Papua New Guinea. It was formally described as a new species by André Aptroot in 1997, with the name Pyrenula quinqueseptata. The type specimen was collected by Aptroot from Yupna valley in Finisterre Range (Huon Peninsula) at an elevation of about 2600 m, where it was found in a moosy montane forest near a stream. However, the name Pyrenula quinqueseptata was illegitimate as name had already been applied to another lichen, Pyrenula quinqueseptata (Nyl.) Tuck. (1872). Aptroot published Pyrenula sexluminata as a replacement name in his 2012 world key to Anthracothecium and Pyrenula species.

The thallus has a cortex (corticate), brown, and lacks pseudocyphellae; it measures up to 10 cm across and is bordered by a black prothallus. The perithecia are erumpent, breaking through the thallus surface, and measure 0.8–1.3 mm in diameter. The hamathecium is amyloid and contains dispersed oil droplets. The ascospores are five-septate and measure 28–35 × 10–15 micrometres.

== See also ==
- List of Pyrenula species
