= Pyrenula borneensis =

Scientific classification
- Domain: Eukaryota
- Kingdom: Fungi
- Division: Ascomycota
- Class: Eurotiomycetes
- Order: Pyrenulales
- Family: Pyrenulaceae
- Genus: Pyrenula
- Species: P. borneensis

Binomial name
- Pyrenula borneensis Aptroot (2012)

Species of lichen

Pyrenula borneensis is a species of corticolous (bark-dwelling) crustose lichen in the family Pyrenulaceae. It was described as a new species in 2012 by the Dutch lichenologist André Aptroot.

== Taxonomy ==
The type specimen was collected in Gunung Mulu National Park, located in the 4th Division, Baram District of Borneo. It was found growing on the twigs and stem of a young tree in the Valley of Ulu Jerneh, also known as Hidden Valley, at an elevation of about 500 m (1,600 ft). The collection was made by Brian Coppins (number 5126) on 7 April 1978. The holotype specimen is deposited in the herbarium E (Royal Botanic Garden Edinburgh), and an isotype is held at the herbarium ABL (Herbarium Bogoriense, Bogor, Indonesia). It only occurs in Borneo. Aptroot had referred to the species in a publication earlier in the year (a world key to Anthracothecium and Pyrenula) (as ined., or unpublished).

== Description ==
Pyrenula borneensis is characterized by a thin, continuous and smooth thallus with a cortex, and with a distinctive pinkish-white colouration. It lacks pseudocyphellae or crystal-containing pockets. The lichen forms a symbiotic relationship with trentepohlioid algae (i.e., from the green algal genus Trentepohlia.

Its ascomata (fruiting bodies) are perithecioid in form, simple, and dispersed across the surface of the thallus. They are conical and slightly emerge from the surface, measuring about 0.5 to 1.3 mm in diameter. These structures are black and distinctly lack a covering layer of the thallus around their edges. The ascomatal wall is carbonized only on the upper part, extending horizontally to form a shield-like clypeus about 150 μm thick; it does not react to staining with potassium hydroxide (KOH–).

The ostioles, located at the apex of the ascomata, are black and similarly do not react to KOH. Internally, the hamathecium (the sterile tissue inside the fruiting body) is transparent and densely filled with oil droplets. The asci are cylindrical to club-shaped (cylindrico-clavate), each containing eight ascospores arranged in a single row; they do not have an iodine staining reaction (IKI–).

Ascospores are brown, muriform, and fusiform in shape, typically featuring three primary transverse septa and two to five internal compartments (locules) per row. These spores measure roughly 20–26 μm in length and 10–12 μm in width, with rounded ends and lumina that vary from rounded to irregularly elongated. There is no constriction at the septa. No pycnidia have been observed in this species, and chemical analysis has not revealed the presence of any detectable secondary metabolites (lichen products).

== See also ==
- List of Pyrenula species
