= Pyrenula hawaiiensis =

Scientific classification
- Domain: Eukaryota
- Kingdom: Fungi
- Division: Ascomycota
- Class: Eurotiomycetes
- Order: Pyrenulales
- Family: Pyrenulaceae
- Genus: Pyrenula
- Species: P. hawaiiensis

Binomial name
- Pyrenula hawaiiensis Aptroot (2012)

Species of lichen

Pyrenula hawaiiensis is a rare species of corticolous (bark-dwelling) crustose lichen in the family Pyrenulaceae. It is known only from a single collection made in Hawaii in 1979.

== Taxonomy ==
Pyrenula hawaiiensis was described as a new species by the Dutch lichenologist André Aptroot in 2012. The lichen is known only from its type collection made near the Kaumana Cave on the island of Hawaii. There, it was found growing on the fallen branches of Acacia koa, in a collection made by Otto Degener in 1979. The type is kept at the herbarium STU (State Museum of Natural History Stuttgart). Aptroot had referred to the species in a publication earlier in the year (a world key to Anthracothecium and Pyrenula) as ined., or unpublished.

== Description ==
Pyrenula hawaiiensis has a smooth, thin, corticate thallus that is pale yellowish and continuous, without pseudocyphellae or embedded crystal deposits. Its photobiont partner is a trentepohlioid alga. The ascomata (fruiting bodies) of this lichen are perithecioid in form, simple, dispersed, and pear-shaped (pyriform), emerging slightly from the thallus surface. These black fruiting bodies range from 0.2 to 0.4 mm in diameter and are usually partly covered by the thallus. The ascomatal wall is uniformly carbonized and about 40 μm thick; it lacks crystals and shows no reaction with potassium hydroxide solution (K–).

The ostioles are brown, skewed laterally, and point in various directions. They similarly do not react with KOH. Internally, the hamathecium is clear (hyaline) and does not contain oil droplets. Asci are cylindrico-clavate and contain eight irregularly arranged ascospores, showing no staining reaction with iodine (IKI–).

The ascospores are brown, fusiform, and have three septa without constrictions at the septal points. They measure roughly 21–23 μm in width and 95–140 μm in length. The spore ends are somewhat pointed, and the internal compartments (lumina) are typically diamond-shaped with sharp angles. The lumina positioned at the ends of the spore are separated from the spore walls by an endospore layer. Pycnidia have not been observed to occur in this species. Chemically, the thallus fluoresces yellow under ultraviolet light (UV+) due to the presence of lichexanthone.

== See also ==
- List of Pyrenula species
