= Pyrenula gahavisukana =

Scientific classification
- Kingdom: Fungi
- Division: Ascomycota
- Class: Eurotiomycetes
- Order: Pyrenulales
- Family: Pyrenulaceae
- Genus: Pyrenula
- Species: P. gahavisukana

Binomial name
- Pyrenula gahavisukana Aptroot (1997)
- Holotype: Mount Gahavisuka Provincial Park, New Guinea

Species of lichen

Pyrenula gahavisukana is a species of corticolous (bark-dwelling) crustose lichen in the family Pyrenulaceae. Described as a new species in 1997 by André Aptroot, it is found in the Eastern Highlands Province of Papua New Guinea. As of its original publication, it was known only from the type locality in Mount Gahavisuka Provincial Park, where it was collected in a mossy mountain forest at 2400 m elevation. It is suspected to have a pantropical distribution, and has since been recorded from Costa Rica, Colombia, and Brazil.

The thallus is outlined by a black prothallus and lacks pseudocyphellae (pores for gas exchange). The perithecia are hemispherical, at first immersed in the thallus and later becoming emergent, measuring 0.6–0.8 mm in diameter. The ascospores are narrowly pointed at the ends and distinctly divided by true septa (euseptate), with dimensions of 28–32 × 14–16 micrometres.

== See also ==
- List of Pyrenula species
