= Pyrenula thailandica =

Scientific classification
- Kingdom: Fungi
- Division: Ascomycota
- Class: Eurotiomycetes
- Order: Pyrenulales
- Family: Pyrenulaceae
- Genus: Pyrenula
- Species: P. thailandica

Binomial name
- Pyrenula thailandica Aptroot (2012)
- Holotype: Doi Suthep, Thailand

Species of lichen

Pyrenula thailandica is a species of corticolous (bark-dwelling) crustose lichen in the family Pyrenulaceae. It is found in Thailand, India, and Papua New Guinea.

== Taxonomy ==
The lichen was described as a new species in 2012 by the Dutch lichenologist André Aptroot. The type specimen was collected on Doi Suthep along the transect to Wat Palad (Chiang Mai province, Thailand). It was found in a dry evergreen forest growing on the bark of Xylia xylocarpa at an elevation of 680 m (2,230 ft). The collection was made by Pat Wolseley and Maria Begoña Aguirre-Hudson (collection number 5718) on 26 November 1991. The holotype specimen is preserved at the herbarium of the Natural History Museum, London (BM), with an isotype deposited at Herbarium Bogoriense (ABL) in Indonesia. Aptroot had referred to the species in a publication earlier in the year (a world key to Anthracothecium and Pyrenula) as ined., or unpublished.

== Description ==
Pyrenula thailandica has a smooth, relatively thick, and continuous surface (thallus) covered by a protective outer layer (cortex). Its brownish thallus features occasional pale dots, which are pockets containing small crystals. Like many lichens, it forms a symbiotic relationship with trentepohlioid algae that help provide nutrients through photosynthesis.

This species produces ascomata (fruiting bodies) measuring about 0.6–1.1 mm across. These black fruiting bodies are partly embedded in or slightly protrude from the thallus and are mostly covered by its surface. Their walls contain crystals, have a uniform carbonized (blackened) structure, and show no reaction to potassium hydroxide solution (KOH–). Each structure has a brown apical opening (ostiole) and contains cylindrical club-shaped sacs (asci) with eight irregularly arranged spores (ascospores). The spores are brown, spindle-shaped, divided into four compartments by three septa, and measure about 35–51 μm long by 14–20 μm wide. Older spores may contain red oil droplets. No secondary reproductive structures (pycnidia) have been observed in this species, and chemical tests have not detected any secondary metabolites (lichen products).

== See also ==
- List of Pyrenula species
