= Pyrenula minae =

Scientific classification
- Kingdom: Fungi
- Division: Ascomycota
- Class: Eurotiomycetes
- Order: Pyrenulales
- Family: Pyrenulaceae
- Genus: Pyrenula
- Species: P. minae

Binomial name
- Pyrenula minae Aptroot & Lucking (2008)

Species of lichen-forming fungus

Pyrenula minae is a species of corticolous (bark-dwelling), crustose lichen in the family Pyrenulaceae. It was formally described in 2008 from material collected in closed primary lowland rainforest at the La Selva Biological Station in Costa Rica. On bark, it forms thin, olive-brown crusts dotted with solitary, cone-shaped perithecia (flask-shaped fruiting bodies), which can be dusted with a fragile red pigment layer. The species name honors Costa Rica's Ministry of Environment and Energy (MINAE) and its SINAC division for supporting the fieldwork behind the original collections.

== Taxonomy ==
It was described as a new species in 2008 by the lichenologists André Aptroot and Robert Lücking from material collected in the La Selva Protection Zone at the La Selva Biological Station in Heredia, Costa Rica. In the type locality, it was found on bark at the base of a tree trunk in closed primary lowland rainforest at about 50 m (160 ft) elevation.

The original description stated that the species was dedicated to Costa Rica's Ministry of Environment and Energy (MINAE, Ministerio de Ambiente y Energia) and its subdivision SINAC, in recognition of their support of the TICOLICHEN project through the prompt provision of work and collecting permits. The authors also suggested that Pyrenula minae was, at the time, the only Pyrenula known with strongly constricted mature ascospores and proposed it as a possible link between the large genus Pyrenula and the small, highly specialized mazaedioid lineage recognized as Pyrgillus. They remarked that the darkened outer septa recall the spores of the mazaedioid genus Tylophoron, while the appearance of young spores recalls certain Lithothelium species, and they noted that its ascospores are more similar to those of Pyrgillus than to those of Pyrenula pyrgillospora, which differs in lacking a red pruina on the perithecia.

== Description ==
The lichen forms thin, olive-brown, corticate patches of thallus (the main lichen body) that can cover an area up to about 10 cm (4 in) in diameter and lack a hypothallus (a dark marginal zone of fungal tissue). Its perithecia (flask-shaped fruiting bodies) are sessile and conical, occurring singly and measuring about 0.7–1.7 mm in diameter, with a central cavity (centrum) about 0.4–0.6 mm across. The perithecia are black and may be bare or covered by a thin layer of red-pigmented crystals about 5–10 μm thick that partly erodes with age. Each perithecium has a vertical, pale-brown ostiole (opening) about 0.1–0.2 mm wide, raised on a papilla up to about 0.2 mm high.

Under the microscope, each perithecium has a thick clypeus (a shield-like covering) about 70–120 μm thick, a thinner black wall about 10–20 μm thick that extends below the hamathecium (tissue between the asci), and a clypeus that spreads widely beyond the perithecium. The hamathecium is inspersed (filled with fine granules) and does not react with iodine (IKI–), and its filaments are unbranched. Each ascus contains eight gray-brown to dark-brown ascospores that are three-septate (3-eu- and distoseptate), measuring about 23–28 × 11–13 μm. The spore compartments (lumina) are rounded but unusually wide, with the end compartments often pressed close to the outer wall. The outer septa are strongly darkened, and mature spores are sharply constricted at the median septum. In standard lichen spot tests, the thallus is UV–, while the red perithecial pigment reacts dark red with potassium hydroxide (KOH+).

== See also ==
- List of Pyrenula species
