= Pyrenula monospora =

Scientific classification
- Kingdom: Fungi
- Division: Ascomycota
- Class: Eurotiomycetes
- Order: Pyrenulales
- Family: Pyrenulaceae
- Genus: Pyrenula
- Species: P. monospora

Binomial name
- Pyrenula monospora Aptroot & Sipman (2013)
- Holotype: North slope of Mount Roraima, Guyana

Species of lichen-forming fungus

Pyrenula monospora is a species of corticolous (bark-dwelling) crustose lichen in the family Pyrenulaceae. The species is remarkable for producing only one exceptionally large ascospore per spore sac instead of the typical eight, with each spore measuring up to 350 micrometers long and densely divided by cross-walls into many small chambers. It forms a thick yellowish-gray crust on smooth bark in montane forests and has been recorded from Guyana, Puerto Rico, and several Brazilian states.

== Taxonomy ==
This species was described as new by André Aptroot and Harrie Sipman in 2013. The holotype was collected by the authors on the north slope of Mount Roraima (campsite 5) in the Upper Mazaruni District, Guyana, from a fallen log in virgin mossy forest.

== Description ==
This species is unique in its genus because each ascus produces a single, very large ascospore instead of eight. The thallus is thick, oily and yellowish gray, with minute pseudocyphellae (pores for gas exchange). The perithecia (fruiting bodies) burst through the surface and are nearly spherical, 0.7–1.2 mm in diameter. Each has a depressed apical pore that may be pale brown to black. The hamathecium is clear but gives a reddish staining reaction in iodine. The solitary spore in each ascus is densely divided by both transverse and longitudinal septa into many small chambers. It measures 205–350 μm long and 30–45 μm wide and has two to seven primary cross‑walls plus numerous secondary divisions. The chambers are rounded and constricted at the main septa. The outer wall is relatively thin, and the tips of the spore have a thickened inner layer. No asexual structures or characteristic lichen substances have been recorded.

== Habitat and distribution ==
Pyrenula monospora grows on smooth bark on montane forest. It occurs in Guyana and Puerto Rico. It has also been recorded from the Brazilian states of Amazonas, São Paulo, and Paraná.

== See also ==
- List of Pyrenula species
