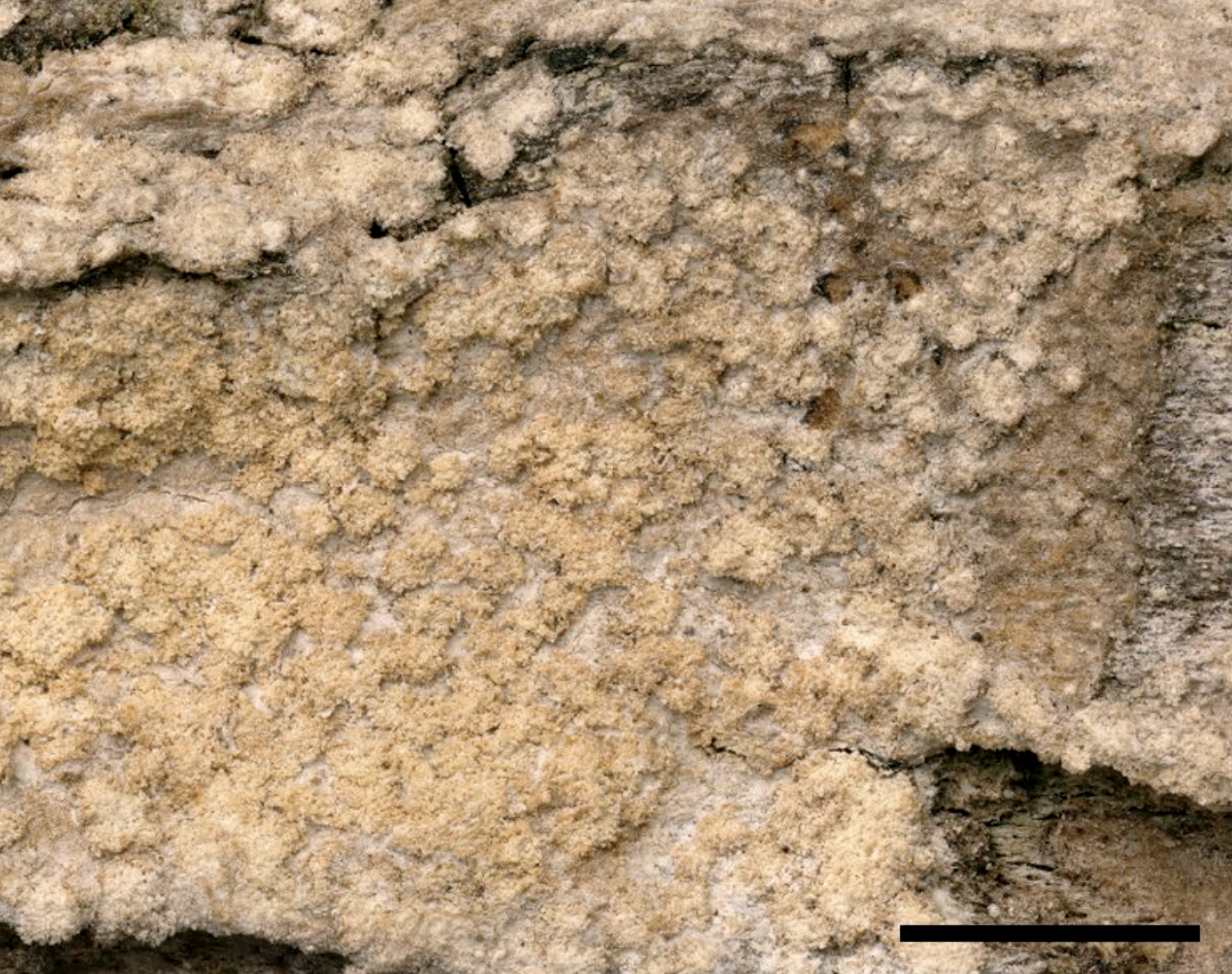
- Holotype specimen of Serusiauxia inexpectata, showing its sorediate thallus; scale bar = 2.5 mm

Scientific classification
- Kingdom: Fungi
- Division: Ascomycota
- Class: Eurotiomycetes
- Order: Pyrenulales
- Family: Pyrenulaceae
- Genus: Serusiauxia; Ertz & Diederich (2020)
- Species: S. inexpectata

Binomial name
- Serusiauxia inexpectata Ertz & Diederich (2020)
- Holotype: Sir Seewoosagur Ramgoolam Botanical Garden, Mauritius

= Serusiauxia =

Monotypic genus of lichen

Serusiauxia is a monotypic fungal genus in the family Pyrenulaceae. It contains a single species, Serusiauxia inexpectata, a corticolous (bark-dwelling), crustose lichen found in Mauritius. Serusiauxia is morphologically distinct within the Pyrenulaceae due to its sorediate thallus and chemistry involving gyrophoric acid, a combination of characteristics that is not observed in any other Pyrenulaceae genera.

== Taxonomy ==
Genus Serusiauxia was established by Damien Ertz and Paul Diederich in 2020 to accommodate a unique species within the family Pyrenulaceae. The type specimen was collected by Diederich from the Sir Seewoosagur Ramgoolam Botanical Garden (Pamplemousses District, Mauritius), at an elevation of 80 m (260 ft), where it was found growing on a more or less vertical trunk of a Terminalia tree. The species is characterised by its sorediate thallus and the presence of gyrophoric acid. The genus is distinguished from other genera in the Pyrenulaceae by its chemical composition, specifically the C+ (red) soralia reaction due to gyrophoric acid.

The genus is named in honour of Emmanuël Sérusiaux, recognising his significant contributions to the field of lichenology, particularly in tropical regions. The species epithet inexpectata alludes to its surprising taxonomic classification within the family Pyrenulaceae, given its morphological resemblance to certain species in the order Arthoniales.

Molecular phylogenetics analyses place Serusiauxia as a sister taxon to Lithothelium septemseptatum, positioned basally within a clade that includes the genus Anthracothecium and several species of Pyrenula, such as Pyrenula nitida (the type species of Pyrenula). This clade corresponds to 'Pyrenulaceae, Group 1' as defined by Cécile Gueidan and colleagues in 2016. The phylogenetic results suggest that Pyrenula should be divided into multiple genera. Serusiauxia and Lithothelium septemseptatum form a distinct clade, separate from Pyrenula (in the strict sense) and Anthracothecium, indicating significant genetic divergence.

== Description ==
Serusiauxia inexpectata is a crustose lichen with a thin and rather inconspicuous thallus, which primarily grows within the bark (endophloeodal). Its colour ranges from whitish to pale cream, with a brownish prothallus. The photobiont, the photosynthetic partner in the lichen, is trentepohlioid, featuring cells that measure between 6–11 micrometres (μm) in length and 4–8 μm in width.

The lichen produces numerous soralia, which are structures that produce powdery reproductive propagules called soredia. These soralia are dense and small when young, appearing as tiny dots that eventually erupt from the thallus. They can be flat to slightly convex and contain loosely packed soredia. Over time, they can spread and merge, sometimes forming a nearly continuous crust over large areas of the thallus. The colour of the soralia varies from pale creamish brown to rarely pale greyish-almost white.

The soredia lack protruding hyphae (filamentous structures of the fungus) and measure between 25 and 60 μm in diameter. The hyphae themselves are 2–2.5 μm in diameter and are covered with tiny, colourless (hyaline) crystals that dissolve in potassium hydroxide (K) solution. Calcium oxalate crystals are also present, mostly measuring 0.5–4 μm in diameter, with a few larger ones up to 12 μm. Ascomata (spore-producing structures) and conidiomata (structures producing asexual spores) have not been observed to occur in this species.

Chemically, both the thallus and the soralia react with chemical spot tests: they are C+ (fleetingly red), K+ (weakly pale yellow), and do not react with P−, UV−, I−, and KI−. Thin-layer chromatography has revealed the presence of gyrophoric acid in the lichen.

== Similar species ==
Serusiauxia inexpectata can be compared to several other lichens, although key differences set it apart:

Dendrographa decolorans: This species differs by having soralia that range from mauve-grey to pale lilac-grey in colour. It also has different chemical properties, featuring unidentified fatty acids and a C− thallus. Additionally, Dendrographa decolorans is found mainly in Mediterranean and temperate regions and belongs to a different phylogenetic group (Arthoniomycetes, Roccellaceae).

Syncesia myrticola (sorediate morphs): This species differs chemically by containing protocetraric acid, with a thallus that reacts PD+ (rust-red). It is morphologically similar but can be distinguished by its distinct chemical reactions.

Opegrapha fumosa: While this species also has a thin, inconspicuous thallus with C+ red soralia (due to gyrophoric acid), its soralia are less dense, more irregular, and often elliptical. Furthermore, Opegrapha fumosa is confined to temperate regions.

== Habitat and distribution ==
Serusiauxia inexpectata is known to occur in specific locations within Mauritius and the Seychelles. In Mauritius, it has been recorded in the Sir Seewoosagur Ramgoolam Botanical Garden and the Curepipe Botanic Gardens, where it typically grows on the bark of large trees, such as Mangifera (mango) and Terminalia species. In the Seychelles, the species has been found on the island Mahé, specifically within the 'Jardin du Roi' parkland.
