= Pyrenula xanthoglobulifera =

Scientific classification
- Domain: Eukaryota
- Kingdom: Fungi
- Division: Ascomycota
- Class: Eurotiomycetes
- Order: Pyrenulales
- Family: Pyrenulaceae
- Genus: Pyrenula
- Species: P. xanthoglobulifera

Binomial name
- Pyrenula xanthoglobulifera Aptroot, Lücking & M.Cáceres (2013)

Species of lichen

Pyrenula xanthoglobulifera is a species of corticolous (bark-dwelling) crustose lichen in the family Pyrenulaceae. First described in 2013 from specimens collected in Chapada do Araripe, Brazil, it is characterized by its pale yellowish-brown thallus with white pseudocyphellae, spherical fruiting bodies immersed in thalline warts, and large brown muriform ascospores visible even under a stereo microscope. The species is distinguished by the presence of lichexanthone, which causes the thallus to fluoresce yellow under ultraviolet light. It primarily grows on smooth tree bark in Caatinga forest environments in northeastern Brazil, and has also been recorded in Guadeloupe and the Pantanal wetland region of west-central Brazil.

== Taxonomy ==
The species was first described by the lichenologists André Aptroot, Robert Lücking, and Marcela Cáceres in 2013 from specimens collected in Chapada do Araripe, Ceará State, Brazil. The species epithet xanthoglobulifera refers to two of its distinguishing characteristics: xantho (from Greek, meaning yellow) refers to the presence of the chemical compound lichexanthone, while globulifera indicates its spherical or globose fruiting bodies.

Pyrenula xanthoglobulifera is closely related to Pyrenula globifera, but differs in several important characteristics, most notably the presence of lichexanthone (which gives parts of the thallus a yellow fluorescence under ultraviolet light) and its fruiting bodies being fully covered by thalline warts.

== Description ==
Pyrenula xanthoglobulifera is a crustose lichen, meaning it grows closely attached to its substrate, forming a crust-like thallus. Its thallus is dull, pale yellowish-brown in colour, and features distinctive white pseudocyphellae (small pores in the upper surface). The thallus lacks a prothallus line (a dark boundary around the edge). The lichen contains trentepohlioid algae as its photobiont (the photosynthetic partner in the symbiotic relationship). Its reproductive structures (ascomata) are globose, single, and relatively evenly dispersed, measuring 0.6–0.9 mm in diameter. These are immersed in undifferentiated superficial corticated warts of 1.0–1.4 mm in diameter and are only visible from above by their black ostioles (openings) which are positioned at the apex.

The hamathecium (sterile tissue between asci) consists of unbranched paraphyses containing hyaline oil droplets. Each ascus contains two large brown spores that are densely muriform (divided into many compartments by both longitudinal and transverse walls). These spores are long-ellipsoid in shape, measuring 125–178 by 25–38 μm, and are surrounded by a 5–10 μm thick gelatinous sheath. The spores contain 7–11 primary cross-walls (eusepta) as well as numerous additional internal walls (distosepta). The spores are large enough to be seen with a stereo microscope.

When tested with chemical reagents used in lichen spot tests, the thallus and pseudostromata test negative with C, P, and K, but fluoresce yellow under ultraviolet light due to the presence of lichexanthone.

== Habitat and distribution ==
Pyrenula xanthoglobulifera grows on the smooth bark of trees in Caatinga forest environments. The Caatinga is a biome unique to Brazil, characterized by xerophytic (adapted to dry conditions), woody, thorny and deciduous vegetation. Only about 1% of the Caatinga's territory is protected within conservation areas. The species has been recorded in Brazil (specifically in the Chapada do Araripe region) and in Guadeloupe in the Caribbean. In its habitat, it has been observed growing alongside Lecanora helva. The lichen has also been documented from the Pantanal wetland region in Miranda, Mato Grosso do Sul.

The Chapada do Araripe, where the type specimen was collected, is an isolated table mountain located at the confluence of the borders of Ceará, Pernambuco, and Piauí states in northeastern Brazil. This plateau sits in the middle of Brazil's semiarid region, with an elevation between 870 and 980 m (2,850 and 3,220 ft) above sea level. The area harbours a rich diversity of epiphytic lichens, with crustose lichens being particularly abundant.

== See also ==
- List of Pyrenula species
