= Pyrenula cubica =

Scientific classification
- Kingdom: Fungi
- Division: Ascomycota
- Class: Eurotiomycetes
- Order: Pyrenulales
- Family: Pyrenulaceae
- Genus: Pyrenula
- Species: P. cubica

Binomial name
- Pyrenula cubica Sipman (2023)
- Holotype: Kuyuwini Landing, Upper Takutu-Upper Essequibo Region, Guyana

Species of lichen

Pyrenula cubica is a species of corticolous (bark-dwelling) crustose lichen in the family Pyrenulaceae. It was discovered on the trunk of a single tree in lowland rainforest in southern Guyana and is distinguished by the unusual cube-shaped internal compartments of its microscopic ascospores. The lichen forms a thin, pale brownish crust with small black fruiting bodies on the bark.

== Taxonomy ==
Pyrenula cubica was described as new to science in 2023 by Harrie Sipman from collections made in primary lowland forest near Kuyuwini Landing, in the Upper Takutu-Upper Essequibo Region of southern Guyana. The epithet refers to the distinctive "cubic" shape of the central cavities (lumina) inside its spores. Sipman compared it most closely with P. atropurpurea, which has smaller fruiting bodies and rounded, not cubical, spore lumina; he also discussed similarities and differences with P. circumfiniens, P. wetmorei, and P. minae. Although some features might suggest the related genus Lithothelium, Sipman provisionally retained P. cubica in Pyrenula pending a broader reclassification of this species complex.

== Description ==
Pyrenula cubica is a bark-dwelling lichen with a thin, pale ochre-brown thallus embedded in the outer bark (endoperidermal). It shows no distinctive fluorescence reactions (UV–) and no lichen substances were detected by spot tests or with thin-layer chromatography. The fruiting bodies are simple, black, conical to low dome-shaped perithecia (flask-like structures that release spores through a tiny pore) about 1.0–1.8 mm wide, with a hard carbonized wall (exciple) and an apical ostiole. The tissue between the spore sacs (hamathecium) is clear; asci are slender (about 95–100 × 10–12 μm) and lack an ocular chamber. Spores are produced eight per ascus and are three-septate, broadly spindle-shaped, and small (12–18 × 7–8 μm). Their most diagnostic feature is the square-edged (cubical) central lumina; the end cells have rounded lumina that lie close to the spore tips. A faint darker band often overlies the septa.

Sipman also documented the spore development pathway ("type 2" in his usage): very young spores have a thick outer wall even before septa appear; the median septum forms first, followed by the lateral septa; the spores become pale gray to brown as internal wall layers (endospore) increase; the central lumina become cubical, while the terminal lumina are somewhat globose. Unlike many Pyrenula species, over-mature spores do not shrivel.

== Habitat and distribution ==
All known material was collected on the trunk of a single Ornosia flava tree, 5–15 m above the ground, in seasonally dry, undisturbed primary lowland forest about 230 m elevation in southern Guyana. As of its original publication, the species was known only from this Guyanese locality.

== See also ==
- List of Pyrenula species
