= Pyrenula paraminarum =

Scientific classification
- Kingdom: Fungi
- Division: Ascomycota
- Class: Eurotiomycetes
- Order: Pyrenulales
- Family: Pyrenulaceae
- Genus: Pyrenula
- Species: P. paraminarum

Binomial name
- Pyrenula paraminarum Aptroot & M.Cáceres (2013)
- Holotype: Parque Circuito, Porto Velho, Brazil

Species of lichen-forming fungus

Pyrenula paraminarum is a species of corticolous (bark-dwelling) crustose lichen in the family Pyrenulaceae. The species forms a smooth olive-brown crust on bark and produces tiny hemispherical fruiting bodies 0.3–0.5 mm across that typically occur in clusters of two to eight, with neighboring structures often partially fused but each maintaining its own black pore. It is known from the Brazilian states of Rondônia and Mato Grosso.

== Taxonomy ==
This species was described as new by André Aptroot and Marcela Cáceres in 2013. The holotype was found by the authors in a plantation in Parque Circuito, Porto Velho (Rondônia, Brazil) where it was collected on Hevea brasiliensis bark. The species epithet alludes to a similarity to Pyrenula minarum.

== Description ==
This lichen forms a smooth, oily crust that is olive brown and lacks pseudocyphellae or a marginal line. Its perithecia (fruiting bodies) are hemispherical, 0.3–0.5 mm across, and usually occur in groups of two to eight. Neighboring perithecia may fuse partly sideways, but each keeps its own depressed black pore; this pore is often encircled by a thin ring of whitish crystalline powder. The hamathecium is filled with tiny, colorless oil globules. Each ascus contains eight ascospores arranged in two uneven rows. The spores have three cross‑walls (septa) and measure 16–18 μm long and 5–6 μm wide. Their internal cavities (lumina) are rounded to somewhat angular and are about as long as they are wide. A thickened inner wall occurs at the tips. The thallus bears abundant pycnidia, which produce curved, thread‑like conidia 17–22 μm long and about 0.5 μm wide. No diagnostic lichen substances occur in P. paraminarum. Although morphologically similar to P. minarum, that species has larger spores measuring 25–40 μm long.

== Habitat and distribution ==
Pyrenula paraminarum is a corticolous (bark-dwelling) species. It has been recorded from the Brazilian states of Rondonia and Mato Grosso.

== See also ==
- List of Pyrenula species
