= Pyrenula musaespora =

Scientific classification
- Kingdom: Fungi
- Division: Ascomycota
- Class: Eurotiomycetes
- Order: Pyrenulales
- Family: Pyrenulaceae
- Genus: Pyrenula
- Species: P. musaespora

Binomial name
- Pyrenula musaespora Aptroot & M.Cáceres (2014)
- Holotype: Santa Luzia do Itanhy, Sergipe, Brazil

Species of lichen

Pyrenula musaespora is a species of corticolous (bark-dwelling), crustose lichen in the family Pyrenulaceae. Found in Brazil, this species is characterised by its pale ochraceous thallus and its filiform (thread-like) ascospores, which are 3–5-septate, meaning they are divided into several sections. The ascospores measure 30–37 μm by 3–4 μm.

The type specimen of Pyrenula musaespora was collected from Mata do Crasto in Santa Luzia do Itanhy, Sergipe, Brazil, at an elevation of approximately 10 m (33 ft). The thallus is thin, pale ochraceous, and surrounded by a black prothallus (a border around the thallus) about 0.5 mm wide. It lacks pseudocyphellae (tiny pores on the surface). The ascomata (fruiting bodies) are conical, 0.4–0.65 mm in diameter, and appear on the surface of the bark. They are mostly covered by the thallus, which reveals the black ascomata in an irregular area around the ostiole (the opening). The walls of the ascomata are completely carbonised (blackened), and the ostiole is apical (at the top) and black. The hamathecium, the tissue between the asci (spore-producing structures), contains hyaline (translucent) oil droplets. The ascospores are brown and arranged in a single bundle, with long, elongated internal cavities separated from the wall by a thick layer.

Pyrenula musaespora does not make pycnidia (small asexual fruiting bodies). Chemically, the thallus reacts under ultraviolet light to produce a yellow fluorescence due to the presence of lichexanthone, a xanthone compound that can be identified through thin-layer chromatography.

Pyrenula musaespora grows on smooth bark in undisturbed Atlantic rainforests and is only known to occur in Brazil. This species is notable for its filiform ascospores, a rare feature in the genus Pyrenula. The only other species with similar ascospores is Pyrenula melanophthalma, which differs in that its hamathecium is not inspersed, and its thallus does not contain anthraquinones. The distinctive ochraceous colour of Pyrenula musaespora indicates a high lichexanthone content, and allowed it to be recognised in the field as a potentially new species.

== See also ==
- List of Pyrenula species
