= Pyrenula rubronitidula =

Scientific classification
- Kingdom: Fungi
- Division: Ascomycota
- Class: Eurotiomycetes
- Order: Pyrenulales
- Family: Pyrenulaceae
- Genus: Pyrenula
- Species: P. rubronitidula

Binomial name
- Pyrenula rubronitidula Aptroot & M.Cáceres (2013)
- Holotype: Municipal nature park, Porto Velho, Brazil

Species of lichen-forming fungus

Pyrenula rubronitidula is a species of corticolous (bark-dwelling) crustose lichen in the family Pyrenulaceae. It is recognized by its thin, dark red crust on tree bark and the tiny black dots that mark the openings of its fruiting bodies. The species was described in 2013 from the Brazilian Amazon and known only from lowland rainforest in northern Brazil.

== Taxonomy ==
This species was described as new by André Aptroot and Marcela Cáceres in 2013. The holotype was collected by the authors from the Municipal nature park in Porto Velho (Rondônia, Brazil), where it was found on growing on tree bark in a primary rainforest.

== Description ==
Distinguished by its dark carmine‑red thallus, this lichen forms a thin, smooth and partly glossy crust without pseudocyphellae or a border. Its fruiting bodies (perithecia) are embedded within the bark rather than on the surface; they are pear‑shaped to nearly spherical and only 0.2–0.4 mm in diameter. The only part visible externally is a tiny black pore at the top. The hamathecium is clear, containing no oil droplets. Each ascus contains eight ascospores arranged in two uneven rows. The spores have three cross‑walls and measure 16–19 μm long and 6–7 μm wide. Their internal cavities (lumina) are rounded to slightly angular and are about as long as they are wide. A thickened inner wall is present at the tips. In addition to the perithecia, the thallus contains immersed pycnidia that produce curved, thread‑like conidia 10–14 μm long and about 0.5 μm wide. The intense red color is due to a purple anthraquinone pigment that reacts positively with potassium hydroxide (KOH) solution.

== Habitat and distribution ==
Pyrenula rubronitidula is corticolous and grows on smooth bark. It has been recorded from the Brazilian states of Amazonas, Rondônia, and Amapá.

== See also ==
- List of Pyrenula species
