= Pyrenula pyrgillospora =

Scientific classification
- Kingdom: Fungi
- Division: Ascomycota
- Class: Eurotiomycetes
- Order: Pyrenulales
- Family: Pyrenulaceae
- Genus: Pyrenula
- Species: P. pyrgillospora

Binomial name
- Pyrenula pyrgillospora Aptroot (1997)
- Holotype: Finisterre range, New Guinea

Species of lichen

Pyrenula pyrgillospora is a species of corticolous (bark-dwelling) crustose lichen in the family Pyrenulaceae. Described as a new species in 1997 by André Aptroot, it is found in the Madang Province of Papua New Guinea. The type specimen was collected by Aptroot in the foothills of the Finisterre Range at an elevation of about 230 m, where it was growing on a tree in a rainforest.

The thallus, which lacks a cortex, is shiny and brown, measuring up to 5 cm wide. The perithecia (fruiting bodies) are superficial and flattened, measuring 0.8–1.3 mm in diameter. The ascospores are euseptate, with three tick septa, and resemble those of Pyrgillus, with dimensions of 17–22 × 7–9 micrometres. The spores have bands of dark granules between the lumina, which helps to distinguish it from other members of Pyrenula. A Brazilian species, Pyrenula viridipyrgilla, produces similar Pyrgillus-like ascospores with dark bands between the lumina, but differs in having ascomata that sit on the surface with ostioles at their apex.

== See also ==
- List of Pyrenula species
