= Pyrenula montana =

Scientific classification
- Kingdom: Fungi
- Division: Ascomycota
- Class: Eurotiomycetes
- Order: Pyrenulales
- Family: Pyrenulaceae
- Genus: Pyrenula
- Species: P. montana

Binomial name
- Pyrenula montana Aptroot (1997)
- Holotype: Saruwaged Range, New Guinea

Species of lichen

Pyrenula montana is a species of corticolous (bark-dwelling) crustose lichen in the family Pyrenulaceae. Described as a new species in 1997 by André Aptroot, it is found in the Morobe Province of Papua New Guinea. The type specimen was collected by Aptroot from a tree in a mountain forest in the Saruwaged Range in Timbe valley (Huon Peninsula). It has since been recorded in Thailand, its first reported occurrence in the Northern Hemisphere.

The thallus, which may or may not be outlined by a black prothallus, can reach up to 10 cm wide, has a yellowish-brown colouration and lacks pseudocyphellae (surface pores for gas exchange). The perithecia are hemispherical and become emergent from the thallus surface, measuring 0.6–1.3 mm in diameter. The ascospores are divided by three constrictions, giving them a four-celled appearance, and measure 16–19 × 7–9 micrometres. The partially constricted ascospores are a character that help separate this from other species in Pyrenula.

== See also ==
- List of Pyrenula species
