= Pyrenula viridipyrgilla =

Scientific classification
- Kingdom: Fungi
- Division: Ascomycota
- Class: Eurotiomycetes
- Order: Pyrenulales
- Family: Pyrenulaceae
- Genus: Pyrenula
- Species: P. viridipyrgilla

Binomial name
- Pyrenula viridipyrgilla Aptroot & M.Cáceres (2013)
- Holotype: Fazenda São Francisco, Brazil

Species of lichen-forming fungus

Pyrenula viridipyrgilla is a species of corticolous (bark-dwelling) crustose lichen in the family Pyrenulaceae. The species forms a smooth, glossy olive-green crust that can cover large areas of tree bark and produces tiny pear-shaped fruiting bodies deeply embedded in the bark with pale yellowish waxy openings. It is known only from its type locality in primary rainforest along the Amazonas/Rondônia border in northwestern Brazil.

== Taxonomy ==
This species was described as new to science by André Aptroot and Marcela Cáceres in 2013. The holotype was collected by the authors on the Amazonas/Rondônia border at Fazenda São Francisco off federal highway BR-319, about 30 km (19 mi) north of Porto Velho, where it was found growing on tree bark in primary rainforest.

== Description ==
This species forms a smooth, glossy olive‑green crust that may cover several square decimeters without a border. The thallus lacks pseudocyphellae and a marginal zone. Its fruiting bodies (perithecia) are deeply embedded in the bark rather than sitting on the surface. These pear‑shaped bodies are 0.4–0.7 mm in diameter and open through an off‑centre, pale yellowish, waxy mound about 0.2 mm across that has a small depression. The hamathecium is clear and lacks oil droplets. Each ascus contains eight dark brown ascospores arranged in two uneven rows. The spores have three cross‑walls and measure 19–22 μm long and 9.0–10.5 μm wide. They are constricted at the central septum, and their internal cavities are much wider than they are long. There is no thickened inner wall at the ends; instead, dark granular bands separate the cavities. No asexual structures or secondary metabolites have been reported.

== Habitat and distribution ==
As of its original publication, Pyrenula viridipyrgilla was known only from its type specimen in the type locality. No addition locations were reported in Aptroot and colleagues' 2025 compilation of Brazilian lichen species.

== See also ==
- List of Pyrenula species
