= Pyrenula muriciliata =

Scientific classification
- Kingdom: Fungi
- Division: Ascomycota
- Class: Eurotiomycetes
- Order: Pyrenulales
- Family: Pyrenulaceae
- Genus: Pyrenula
- Species: P. muriciliata

Binomial name
- Pyrenula muriciliata Diederich & Ertz (2020)

Species of lichen

Pyrenula muriciliata is a species of corticolous (bark-dwelling) and crustose lichen in the family Pyrenulaceae. It is found in Mauritius, where it grows on tree bark in parklands and forests.

== Taxonomy ==
Pyrenula muriciliata it was formally described as a new species in 2020 by Paul Diederich and Damien Ertz. The type specimen was collected by the first author in the Brise Fer Forest in Black River Gorges National Park (Rivière Noire District) at an altitude of 585 m (1,919 ft); it has also been recorded from two other locations in Maurutius, Pétrin and Curepipe, with a total elevation range between 565–680 m (1,854–2,231 ft).

== Description ==
The lichen has a thin, brownish to greyish brown to thallus (lacking a cortex with a medium to dark brown prothallus. The photobiont partner is a green alga from the genus Trentepohlia. The lichen's perithecia are 0.5–0.7 mm wide, and have an ostiole to release spores. The ascospores are ellipsoid in shape, and muriform—meaning they have 3 transverse walls dividing the spore into chambers; additionally, the ends of the spore are rounded, and each has a cilium at its base. The specific epithet muriciliata refers to these characteristic spore features.

All chemical spot tests are negative, and no secondary compounds were detected with thin-layer chromatography.

== See also ==
- List of Pyrenula species
