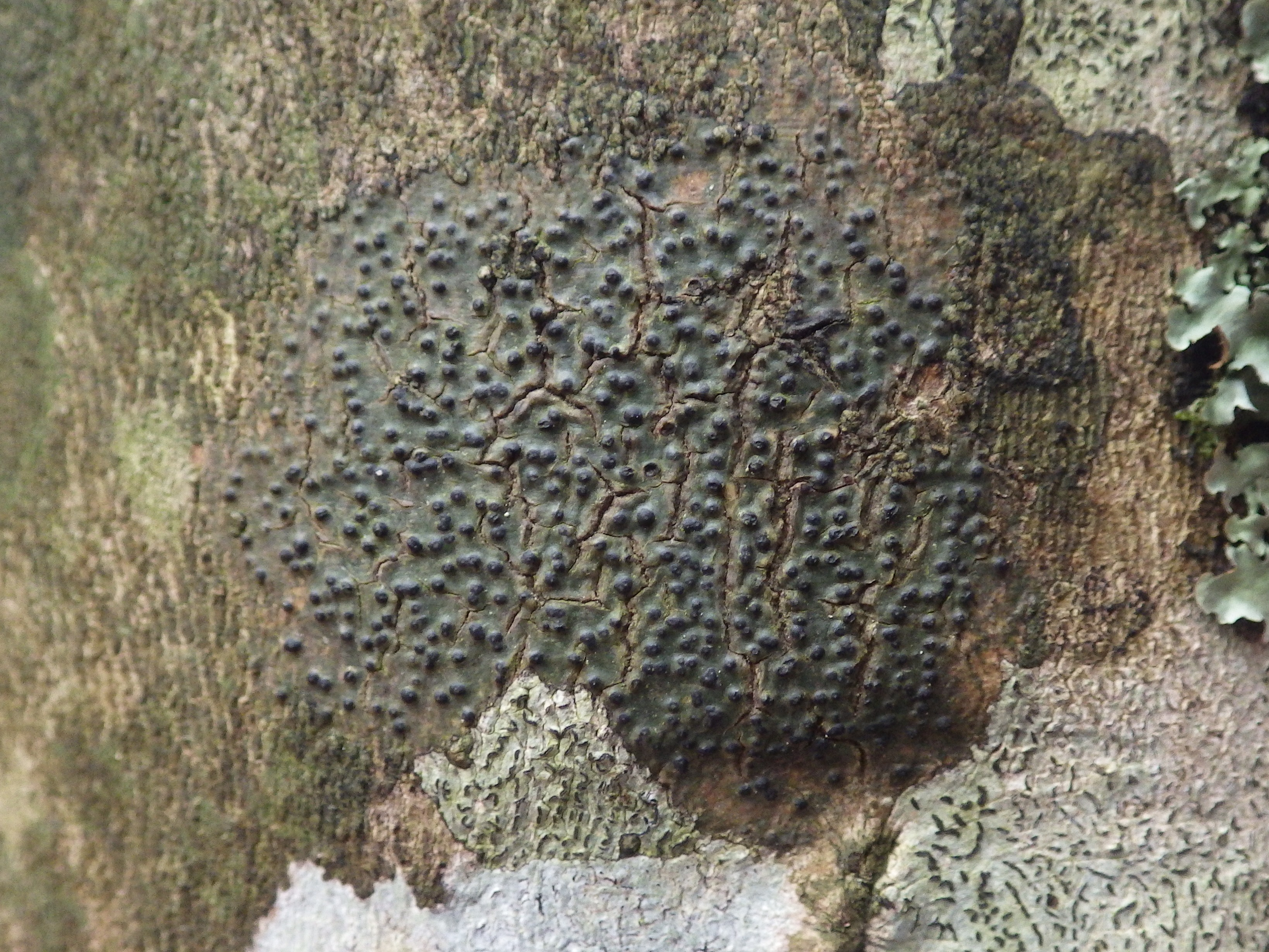

Scientific classification
- Kingdom: Fungi
- Division: Ascomycota
- Class: Eurotiomycetes
- Order: Pyrenulales
- Family: Pyrenulaceae
- Genus: Pyrenula
- Species: P. macrospora

Binomial name
- Pyrenula macrospora (Degel.) Coppins & P.James (1980)

Synonyms
- Pyrenula nitida var. macrospora Degel. (1941); Pyrenula chlorospila var. macrospora (Degel.) Maas Geest. (1958)

= Pyrenula macrospora =

Species of lichen-forming fungus

Pyrenula macrospora is a species of corticolous (bark-dwelling crustose lichen in the family Pyrenulaceae. The lichen has a smooth olive-brown to fawn thallus marked with small white spots, and produces curved ascospores within convex fruiting bodies. It grows on the smooth bark of deciduous trees in oceanic climates, where it is found mainly in western coastal regions of Europe, Asia, and Macaronesia.

== Taxonomy ==
The species was originally described by Gunnar Degelius in 1941 as Pyrenula nitida var. macrospora. Rudolf Arnold Maas Geesteranus thought that the taxon was more appropriately classified as a variety of Pyrenula chlorospila. In 1980, Brian John Coppins and Peter Wilfred James raised it to full species status.

== Description ==
The thallus (the main body of the lichen) is olivaceous to fawn or dark brown, and typically has a smooth surface, including around the perithecia. White pseudocyphellae are present, measuring about 40–120 μm in diameter.

Perithecia measure mainly 0.5–0.9 mm across (occasionally as small as 0.4 mm or as large as 1.2 mm) and form convex projections. The exciple contains numerous colourless crystals, and the hymenium lacks anthraquinones. Ascospores are 3-septate and measure mostly 27–33 × 10–13 μm (overall range 24–36 × 8–13 μm). Pycnidia are frequent and appear as dark dots about 100–180 μm in diameter, usually most evident on younger parts of the thallus and often clustered along boundaries between adjacent thalli. Conidia are curved, measuring 10–16 × about 0.8 μm. Spot tests are C–, K+ (yellow), KC–, and Pd+ (faintly yellow); under ultraviolet light the thallus shows a weak yellow fluorescence that may be absent, attributed to an unidentified substance.

== Habitat and distribution ==
Pyrenula macrospora occurs in temperate areas of the Old World. It has a strongly oceanic distribution, and has been recorded from Asia, Europe, and Macaronesia. It grows on the smooth bark of deciduous trees. In Britain, Pyrenula macrospora has been treated as an "oceanic-widespread" lichen, a biogeographic pattern associated with Atlantic-influenced climates and characterised by concentrations along the western seaboard and relative scarcity away from the Atlantic coast.

A bioclimatic-envelope modelling study based on British records (1960–2006) linked the species' predicted occurrence mainly to winter temperature and winter precipitation. Under UKCIP02 (the UK Climate Impacts Programme's 2002 climate-change scenarios) projections for the 2050s, the same study projected an increase in climatically suitable area for P. macrospora, including a possible expansion into more easterly parts of Britain.

== See also ==
- List of Pyrenula species
