= Pyrenula sanguinea =

Scientific classification
- Domain: Eukaryota
- Kingdom: Fungi
- Division: Ascomycota
- Class: Eurotiomycetes
- Order: Pyrenulales
- Family: Pyrenulaceae
- Genus: Pyrenula
- Species: P. sanguinea

Binomial name
- Pyrenula sanguinea Aptroot, M.Cáceres & Lücking (2013)

Species of lichen

Pyrenula sanguinea is a rare species of lichen belonging to the family Pyrenulaceae. This species is characterized its bright red, prominent to sessile growths on tree bark in the rainforests of Rondônia, Brazil. What makes Pyrenula sanguinea unique are its trypethelioid ascomata—structures housing the reproductive spores—that are fused together, and its brown ascospores (spores) surrounded by a thick, gelatinous sheath with distinctive horn-like appendages.

== Taxonomy ==
Pyrenula sanguinea was formally described in 2013 by the lichenologists Marcela Cáceres, André Aptroot, and Robert Lücking. The name sanguinea, meaning "blood-red", refers to the striking red colour of its pseudostromata, the tissue surrounding the ascomata. Phylogenetic analysis shows that Pyrenula sanguinea is closely related to Pyrenula cruenta, another species known for its bright red pigment, though they differ significantly in morphology and chemistry.

== Description ==
The lichen features a crust-like, somewhat shiny thallus (the main lichen body) that is pale yellowish-brown, often tinged red. It grows as a flat, crusty layer on tree bark. The ascomata, or spore-producing structures, are pear-shaped and grouped together within the red pseudostromata without forming a visible outer layer. These ascomata are unique for their partly fused walls and separate, apical openings visible as black dots. The ascospores are initially transparent but soon turn brown, with three septa (divisions) and distinctive, gelatinous appendages at both ends that dissolve in a specific chemical solution.

Several features characterise the morphology of this species. The pseudostromata are bright red, varying in shape, contributing to the lichen's distinctive appearance. The ascomata are immersed in pseudostromata, with fused outer walls, unique among lichens for resembling those found in genus Trypethelium. Ascospores of the species are brown, with a reduced endospore formation, and bearing long, horn-like appendages.

== Chemistry ==
The lichen's chemistry is complex, with six identified anthraquinone pigments, including haematommone. These substances, responsible for the lichen's colouration, do not evaporate upon application of a potassium hydroxide solution (K+), showing a purple reaction. This chemical makeup is significant for distinguishing Pyrenula sanguinea from other lichens with similar red pigments but different chemical reactions.

== Habitat and distribution ==
This species is found on the smooth bark of trees within the primary rainforest of the Cuniã rain forest reserve in Amazonian Rondônia, Brazil. Its discovery at this single location suggests it may be endemic to this region, thriving in the humid, tropical environment.

== See also ==
- List of Pyrenula species
