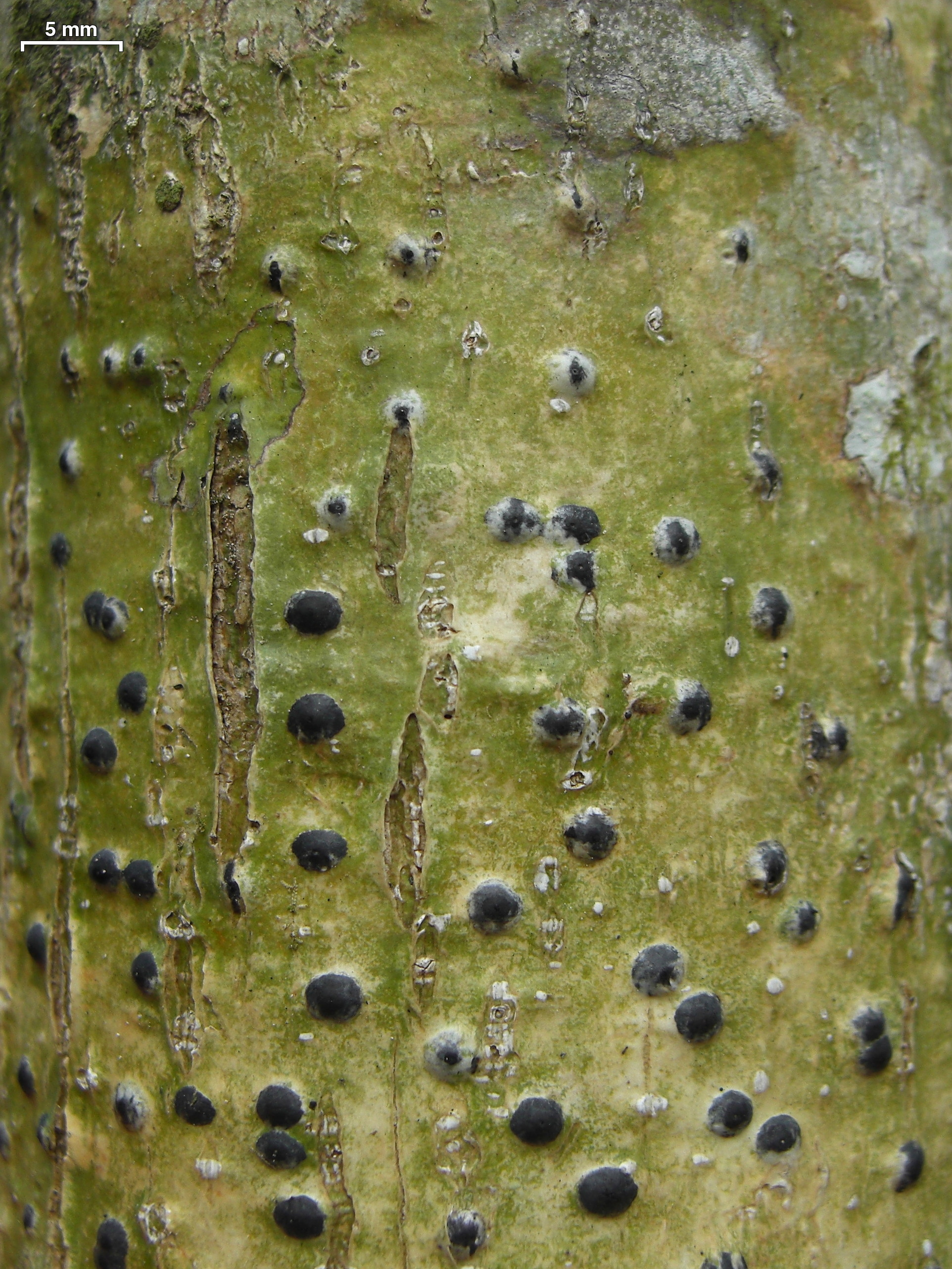

Scientific classification
- Kingdom: Fungi
- Division: Ascomycota
- Class: Eurotiomycetes
- Order: Pyrenulales
- Family: Pyrenulaceae
- Genus: Anthracothecium
- Species: A. prasinum

Binomial name
- Anthracothecium prasinum (Eschw.) R.C.Harris (1987)

Synonyms
- Verrucaria prasina Eschw. (1833); Acrorixis prasina (Eschw.) Trevis. (1860)

= Anthracothecium prasinum =

Species of lichen-forming fungus

Anthracothecium prasinum is a corticolous (bark-dwelling), crustose lichen in the family Pyrenulaceae. It has a pantropical distribution, occurring across tropical regions. It forms black, carbonized (blackened) perithecioid fruiting bodies (pseudothecia) that produce brown, muriform (multichambered) ascospores.

== Taxonomy ==
Anthracothecium prasinum is treated as an accepted species of Anthracothecium by André Aptroot in a 2012 world key to Anthracothecium and Pyrenula. In that work, Anthracothecium is characterized as a small genus in the Pyrenulaceae with five accepted species, and A. prasinum is keyed among them using ascospore arrangement and fruiting body characters.

The basionym of the species is Verrucaria prasina, originally described by Franz Gerhard Eschweiler in 1833. The type specimen was collected by the German botanist Carl Friedrich Philipp von Martius in Pará, Brazil. Robert Egan transferred the taxon to the genus Anthracothecium in 1987. Aptroot lists an extensive synonymy reflecting a long history of placement in multiple genera used for pyrenocarpous lichens. Names treated as synonyms of A. prasinum in Aptroot's account include (among others) Acrorixis prasina, Anthracothecium eschweileri, Anthracothecium praelustre (from Verrucaria praelustris), Parmentaria pallida (from Trypethelium pallidum), and Anthracothecium borbonicum (from Verrucaria borbonica / Sporodictyon borbonicum), as well as Anthracothecium angulatum (and its infraspecific names) and several later combinations and names of uncertain application.

== Description ==
In Aptroot's key, A. prasinum is placed among bark-dwelling pyrenocarpous lichens with brown, (somewhat) muriform ascospores, and it is reached under a pathway that indicates the ascomata are mostly single with an apical ostiole. It is then separated from similar Anthracothecium species by its ascus content: 6–8 ascospores per ascus.

== See also ==
- List of lichens of Brazil
