= Pyrenula cryptothelia =

Scientific classification
- Kingdom: Fungi
- Division: Ascomycota
- Class: Eurotiomycetes
- Order: Pyrenulales
- Family: Pyrenulaceae
- Genus: Pyrenula
- Species: P. cryptothelia

Binomial name
- Pyrenula cryptothelia (Müll.Arg.) Aptroot & Etayo (2003)

Synonyms
- Pyrenastrum cryptothelium Müll.Arg. (1885); Astrothelium cryptothelium (Müll.Arg.) Nyl. (1892); Pyrenastrum depauperatum Malme (1922)

Species of lichen

Pyrenula cryptothelia is a species of corticolous (bark-dwelling) crustose lichen in the family Pyrenulaceae. It has a neotropical distribution.

== Taxonomy ==
Pyrenula cryptothelia was originally described by the Swiss lichenologist Johannes Müller Argoviensis in 1885 as Pyrenastrum cryptothelium. The species has undergone some taxonomic changes: first described as Pyrenastrum cryptothelium, then transferred to Astrothelium by William Nylander in Auguste-Marie Hue's "Nouvelles Archives du Muséum d'Histoire Naturelle" (1892), and finally placed in the genus Pyrenula as Pyrenula cryptothelia in 2003.

== Characteristics ==
Pyrenula cryptothelia is characterized by melanothecoid, partly fused ascomata (fruiting bodies), typically occurring in groups of three or four. It has large apiculate spores measuring 32–37 by 13–15.5 μm with three eusepta; a later review of the genus gives a broader spore length range, 30–45 μm. The species is morphologically similar to Pyrenula cubana, but can be distinguished by its larger spores, as P. cubana has spores measuring 21–25 by 8–10 μm.

== Distribution ==
Pyrenula cryptothelia has been documented in Cuba (type locality), Ecuador (Napo Province and Los Ríos Province), and Panama (Veraguas Province, Bahia Honda, Isla de Canales de Tierra).

== See also ==
- List of Pyrenula species
