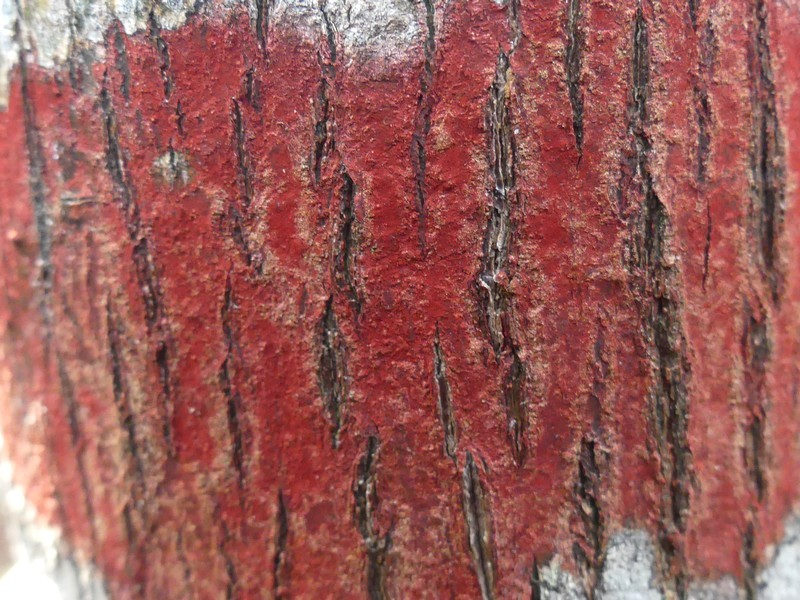

Scientific classification
- Kingdom: Fungi
- Division: Ascomycota
- Class: Eurotiomycetes
- Order: Pyrenulales
- Family: Pyrenulaceae
- Genus: Pyrenula
- Species: P. cruenta

Binomial name
- Pyrenula cruenta (Mont.) Vain. (1890)

Synonyms
- List: Trypethelium cruentum Mont. (1837); Stromatothelium cruentum (Mont.) Trevis. (1861); Melanotheca cruenta (Mont.) Müll.Arg. (1885); Verrucaria circumrubens Nyl. (1868); Pyrenula circumrubens (Nyl.) B.de Lesd. (1910); Trypethelium rubrum C.Knight (1884); Melanotheca rubra (C.Knight) C.Knight (1889)

= Pyrenula cruenta =

Species of lichen

Pyrenula cruenta is a species of corticolous (bark-dwelling) crustose lichen in the family Pyrenulaceae. It has a pantropical distribution.

== Taxonomy ==
The species was introduced by Camille Montagne in 1837 as Trypethelium cruentum. Montagne recorded the species on the rough bark of trees in Guiana (French Guiana), based on material collected by Leprieur. The species was later shifted between allied pyrenocarpous genera—Trevisan placed it in Stromatothelium (1861) and Müller Argoviensis in Melanotheca (1885)—before Vainio transferred it to Pyrenula in 1890 as Pyrenula cruenta, the name now in use. Names since brought into synonymy include Verrucaria circumrubens Nyl. (1868), later recombined as Pyrenula circumrubens by B.de Lesdain (1910), and Trypethelium rubrum C.Knight (1884), which Knight himself recombined as Melanotheca rubra (1889).

== Description ==
Montagne's protologue depicts a bark-dwelling lichen with a very thin, cartilage-like thallus that is olive-brown or sometimes so scant as to be almost invisible. The fertile parts appear as uneven, convex "warts" that often run together in short lines; he notes their "bloody" coloration, with a black interior. Each wart houses a perithecium (the flask-shaped fruiting body typical of pyrenocarpous lichens) that is globose to egg-shaped and bears a small nipple-like pore (ostiole). As the tissue weathers, the dark perithecial top becomes exposed and is encircled by a narrow, paler halo. The asci contain two-celled (1-septate) ascospores that are ellipsoid and somewhat swollen (ventricose); each cell includes a conspicuous round oil droplet. The ascospores are 27–35 micrometres long.

The pigment responsible for the red colour of the thallus is draculone, an anthraquinone compound. It is accompanied by minor amounts of haematommone.

== Habitat and distribution ==
Pyrenula cruenta has a pantropical distribution, including Florida in the United States, where it grows on sun-exposed branches of trees on lake and marsh shores.

== See also ==
- List of Pyrenula species
