= Xenus =

Xenus is the genus name of:

- Xenus (fungus), a lichen sac fungus in the order Pyrenulales
- Xenus (bird), a genus of birds in the family Scolopacidae
