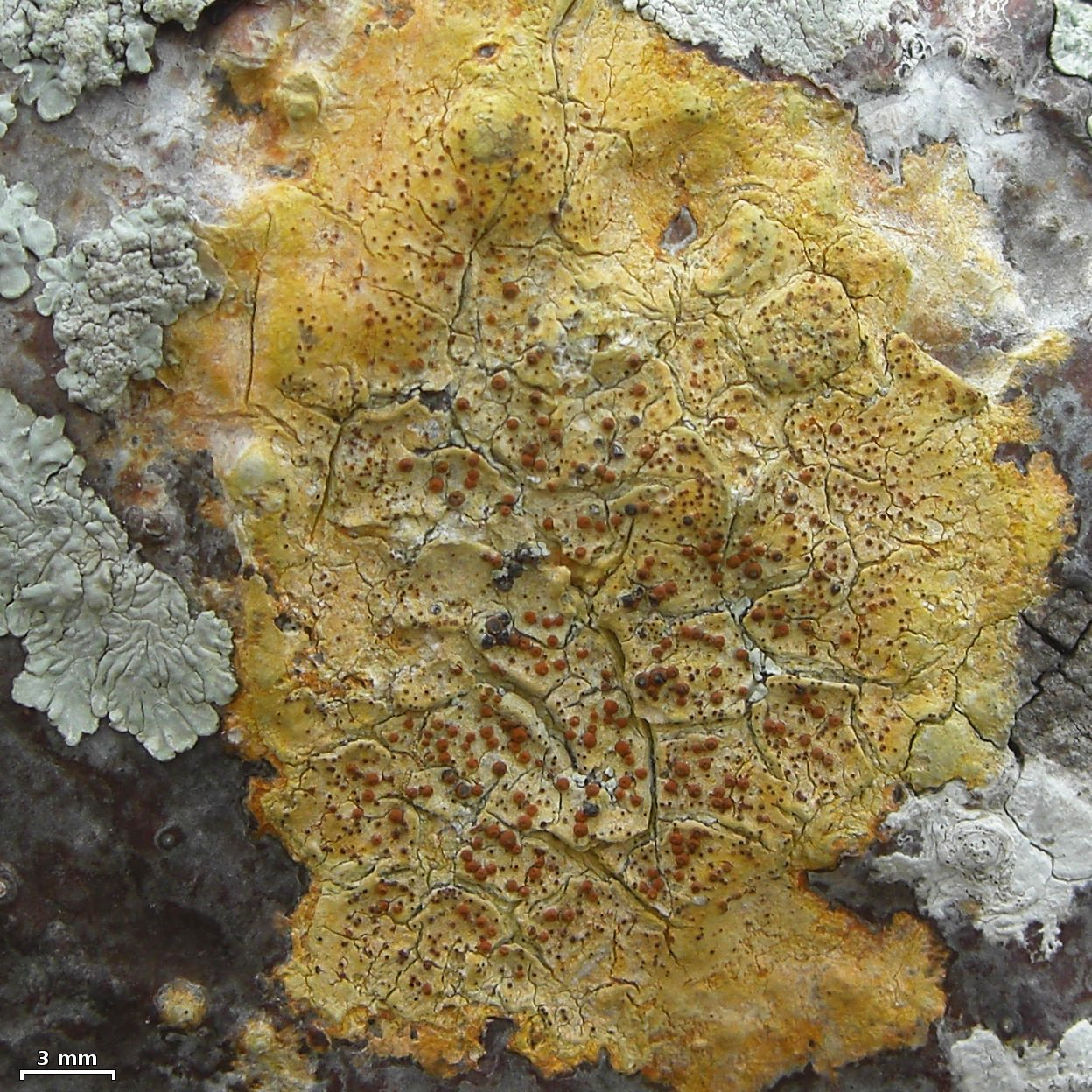
- on Santa Fe Island (Galápagos); scale bar = 0.3 mm

Conservation status
- Apparently Secure (NatureServe)

Scientific classification
- Domain: Eukaryota
- Kingdom: Fungi
- Division: Ascomycota
- Class: Eurotiomycetes
- Order: Pyrenulales
- Family: Pyrenulaceae
- Genus: Pyrenula
- Species: P. ochraceoflava

Binomial name
- Pyrenula ochraceoflava (Nyl.) R.C.Harris (1989)

Synonyms
- Verrucaria ochraceoflava Nyl. (1858); Sporodictyon ochraceoflavum (Nyl.) Trevis. (1860); Verrucaria ochraceoflavens Nyl. (1863); Anthracothecium ochraceoflavens (Nyl.) Zahlbr. (1921); Bottaria ochraceoflavens (Nyl.) Vain. (1915); Pyrenula ochraceoflavens (Nyl.) R.C.Harris (1989); Pyrenula ochraceoflava var. pacifica P.M.McCarthy (2000)

= Pyrenula ochraceoflava =

Species of lichen

Pyrenula ochraceoflava is a species of corticolous, crustose lichen in the family Pyrenulaceae. It is a common lowland and coastal species with a pantropical distribution. Its distribution in the Pacific Ocean includes the Caroline Islands, Galápagos Islands, New Caledonia, Tuamotu, and Western Samoa. The lichen was first formally described by Finnish lichenologist William Nylander in 1858 as a species of Verrucaria. Richard Harris transferred it to the genus Pyrenula in 1989. The variety pacifica, found on the Cook Islands (South Pacific Ocean) was proposed by Patrick McCarthy in 2000. It is distinguished from the nominate variety by its pigmented thallus and perithecia, ascospore size and shape, and the presence of a single transverse septum in its ascospores.

== See also ==
- List of Pyrenula species
