= Granulopyrenis =

Scientific classification
- Kingdom: Fungi
- Division: Ascomycota
- Class: Eurotiomycetes
- Order: Pyrenulales
- Family: Pyrenulaceae
- Genus: Granulopyrenis; Aptroot

Type species
- Granulopyrenis antillensis Aptroot

Genus of fungi

Granulopyrenis is a genus of fungi in the family Pyrenulaceae.
