= Distopyrenis =

Scientific classification
- Domain: Eukaryota
- Kingdom: Fungi
- Division: Ascomycota
- Class: Eurotiomycetes
- Order: Pyrenulales
- Family: Pyrenulaceae
- Genus: Distopyrenis; Aptroot (1991)

Type species
- Distopyrenis americana Aptroot (1991)

Genus of fungi

Distopyrenis is a genus of fungi in the family Pyrenulaceae.
