= Pyrenowilmsia =

Scientific classification
- Kingdom: Fungi
- Division: Ascomycota
- Class: Eurotiomycetes
- Order: Pyrenulales
- Family: Pyrenulaceae
- Genus: Pyrenowilmsia; R.C.Harris & Aptroot (1991)

Type species
- Pyrenowilmsia ferruginosa (Müll.Arg.) Aptroot (1991)

Genus of lichen-forming fungi

Pyrenowilmsia is a genus of lichenized fungi in the family Pyrenulaceae. It is a monotypic genus, containing the single species Pyrenowilmsia ferruginosa.
