= Pyrenographa =

Scientific classification
- Kingdom: Fungi
- Division: Ascomycota
- Class: Eurotiomycetes
- Order: Pyrenulales
- Family: Pyrenulaceae
- Genus: Pyrenographa; Aptroot

Type species
- Pyrenographa xylographoides Aptroot

Genus of fungi

Pyrenographa is a genus of fungi in the family Pyrenulaceae.
