= Rhaphidicyrtis =

Scientific classification
- Kingdom: Fungi
- Division: Ascomycota
- Class: Eurotiomycetes
- Order: Pyrenulales
- Genus: Rhaphidicyrtis; Vain. (1921)
- Species: R. trichosporella

Binomial name
- Rhaphidicyrtis trichosporella (Nyl.) Vain. (1921)

Synonyms
- Mycoporum trichosporellum Nyl. (1874); Mycoporellum trichosporellum (Nyl.) Zahlbr. (1903); Leptorhaphis trichosporella (Nyl.) Riedl (1962)

Single-species lichen genus

Rhaphidicyrtis is a fungal genus of uncertain familial placement in the order Pyrenulales. It consists of the single species, Rhaphidicyrtis trichosporella, a bark-dwelling, crustose lichen that forms thin, pale patches on tree bark in humid deciduous woodlands. This small, inconspicuous lichen is characterised by tiny black reproductive structures scattered across its surface and distinctive microscopic features that set it apart from similar species. Originally described from Finnish collections in 1874, R. trichosporella has since been found in several European countries, including Sweden, Denmark, and the British Isles. The genus has been subject to taxonomic debate regarding its classification as a lichen, with recent observations confirming its symbiotic relationship with algae. Despite its widespread distribution, R. trichosporella is often rare within suitable habitats, suggesting specific environmental requirements that are not yet fully understood.

== Taxonomy ==
The genus was cirucmscribed by Edvard August Vainio in 1921 to accommodate this species, which was originally described as Mycoporum trichosporellum by William Nylander in 1874. The type specimen was collected by Edvard Lang (later Edvard August Vainio).

The genus has been subject to some taxonomic uncertainty regarding its lichenisation status. While some authors have treated it as a non-lichenised fungus, others consider it to be lichenised. Recent observations of Swedish specimens confirm the presence of Trentepohlia photobionts in most cases, supporting its classification as a lichen.

Although the genus has been provisionally classified as of uncertain familial position in the order Pyrenulales, recent (2023) molecular phylogenetics work associates the genus with the order Phaeomoniellales.

== Description ==
Rhaphidicyrtis trichosporella is a small, inconspicuous lichen that forms thin, pale crusts on tree bark. The lichen's body (thallus) appears as a faint, pinkish or greyish-white patch, often barely visible to the naked eye. This colouration is due to the presence of Trentepohlia algae, which live in a symbiotic relationship with the fungus, providing it with nutrients through photosynthesis. The most distinctive feature of R. trichosporella is its reproductive structures, called perithecia. These appear as tiny black dots, each measuring only 0.1–0.2 mm in width, scattered across the surface of the thallus. The perithecia are partially embedded in the bark, with a protective shield-like structure (invollucrellum) surrounding their upper portion.

Inside the perithecia, several characteristic microscopic features set Rhaphidicyrtis apart from similar lichens. The inner cavity contains numerous branching and interconnecting thread-like structures called paraphysoids, which support the reproductive cells. The spore-producing sacs (asci) have multiple layers but lack the thickened apex common in many other lichens. The spores themselves are unusually long, thin, and worm-like (filiform), divided into many segments by cross-walls (septa). When treated with iodine-based stain after applying potassium hydroxide solution, the gel-like substance within the perithecium turns a deep blue colour, which is a distinctive chemical reaction for this genus.

In the field, R. trichosporella can be easily overlooked or mistaken for other small, crust-forming lichens or fungi. Its thallus may cover areas up to a few square centimeters, though individual patches are often smaller. The pinkish hue of fresh specimens tends to fade in dried herbarium samples, making proper documentation of field characteristics important for identification.

This lichen typically grows on the bark of deciduous trees in humid, shaded woodland environments. It has been found on various tree species, including alder, beech, and oak, often preferring areas with smooth bark or shallow furrows.

== Habitat and distribution ==
Rhaphidicyrtis trichosporella is primarily found in deciduous woodlands characterised by high humidity and long-standing ecological continuity. The species shows a preference for areas near water bodies such as lakes or streams, which help maintain the moist conditions it requires. It has been recorded in several European countries, including Finland, where it was first described, as well as the British Isles, Belgium, Germany, Poland, Lithuania, Denmark, and Sweden.

As an epiphyte, R. trichosporella grows on the bark of various deciduous trees, including alder, beech, oak, birch, hornbeam, holly, ash, and hazel. It typically appears at heights of 1–2 metres above the ground on tree trunks and seems to prefer smooth bark surfaces, though it has occasionally been found in shallow furrows of rougher bark. In Sweden, the lichen has been observed in diverse woodland habitats, such as alder swamps along creeks, shaded and humid beech forests (particularly on north-facing slopes), and semi-open oak and lime-dominated woodlands.

These habitats often support other rare or threatened lichen species, indicating their importance for lichen conservation. Species frequently found growing alongside R. trichosporella include Graphis scripta, Pertusaria species, and in some locations, the notable lichen Thelotrema lepadinum. Despite targeted searches, R. trichosporella often appears to be rare even within suitable habitats, sometimes being found on only one or two trees in an entire forest stand. This patchy distribution suggests that the species may have specific microhabitat requirements that are not yet fully understood.
