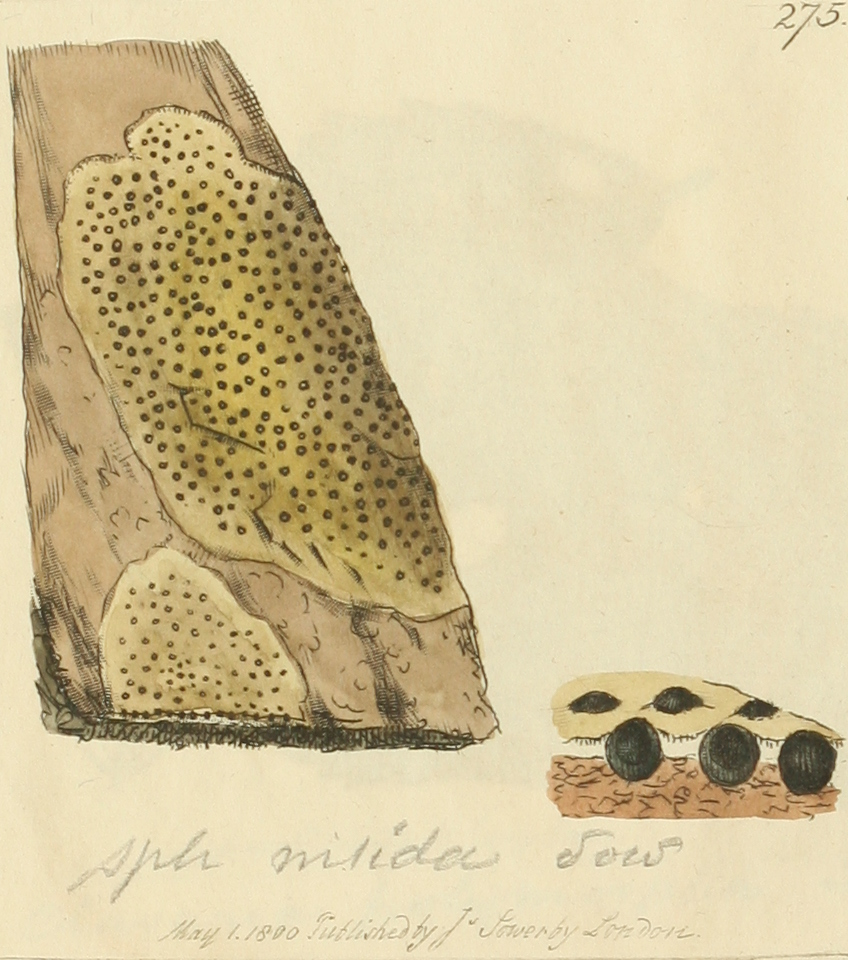

Scientific classification
- Domain: Eukaryota
- Kingdom: Fungi
- Division: Ascomycota
- Class: Eurotiomycetes
- Order: Pyrenulales
- Family: Pyrenulaceae
- Genus: Pyrenula
- Species: P. nitida

Binomial name
- Pyrenula nitida (Weigel) Ach. (1814)

Synonyms
- Sphaeria nitida Weigel (1772)

= Pyrenula nitida =

Species of lichen

Pyrenula nitida is a species of crustose lichen belonging to the family Pyrenulaceae.

It has a cosmopolitan distribution.

== See also ==
- List of Pyrenula species
