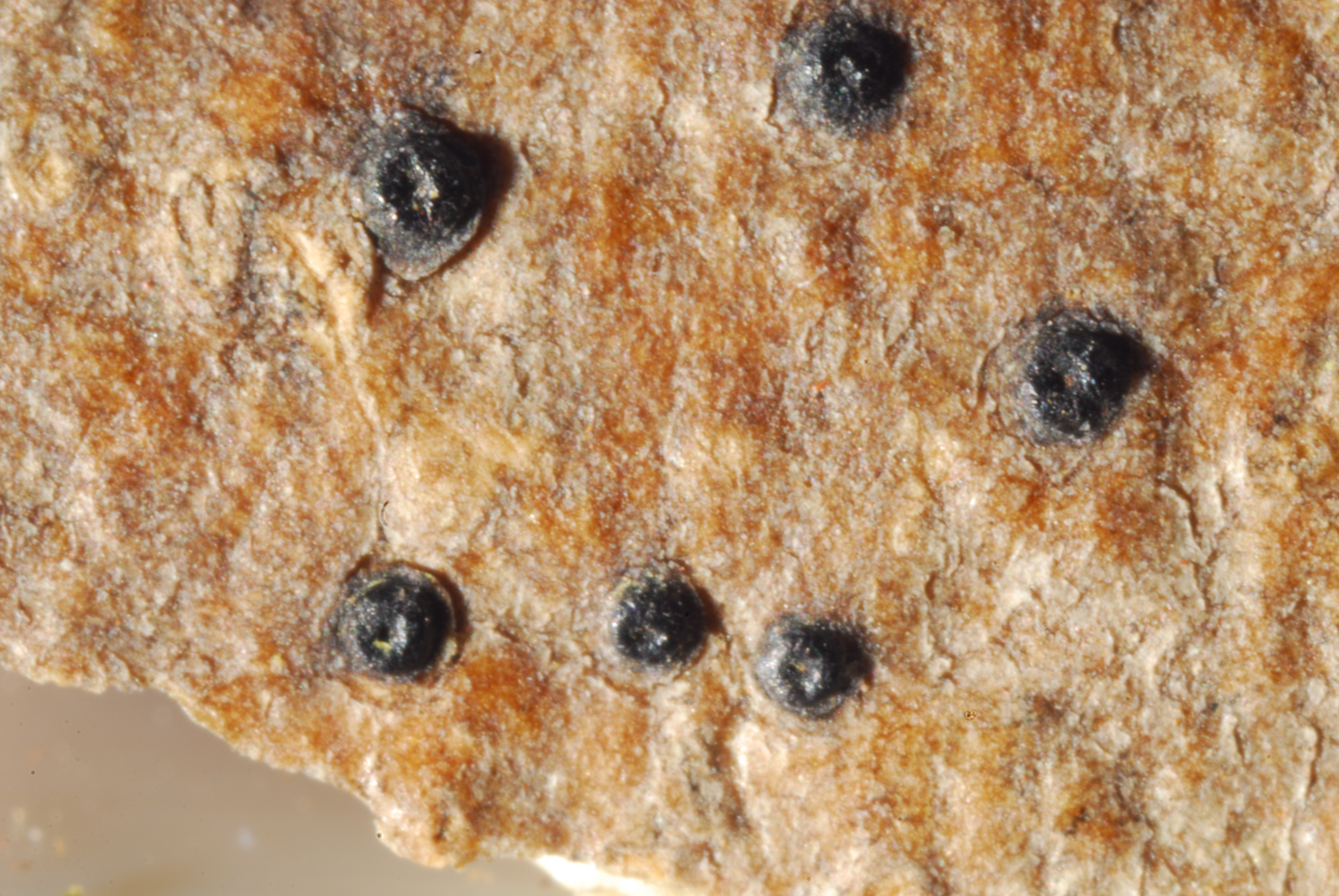
- Blastodesmia nitida; the black structures are perithecia (fruiting bodies)

Scientific classification
- Domain: Eukaryota
- Kingdom: Fungi
- Division: Ascomycota
- Class: Eurotiomycetes
- Order: Pyrenulales
- Family: Pyrenulaceae
- Genus: Blastodesmia; A.Massal. (1852)
- Species: B. nitida

Binomial name
- Blastodesmia nitida A.Massal. (1852)

Synonyms
- List: Polyblastia nitida (A.Massal.) Trevis. (1853); Verrucaria pluriseptata Nyl. (1857); Verrucaria massalongoi Garov. (1865); Cercidospora pluriseptata Arnold (1874); Arthopyrenia pluriseptata Arnold (1891); Arthopyrenia epidermidis var. pluriseptata Boistel (1903); Metasphaeria pluriseptata Sacc. & D.Sacc. (1905)

= Blastodesmia =

Single-species lichen genus

Blastodesmia is a monotypic fungal genus in the family Pyrenulaceae. It contains the single species Blastodesmia nitida, a corticolous (bark-dwelling) crustose lichen found in Europe. Both the genus and the species were described in 1852 by the Italian botanist Abramo Bartolommeo Massalongo. Historically, two other species have been included in the genus, but are currently not accepted by Species Fungorum:

- Blastodesmia albonigra Zahlbr. (1927)
- Blastodesmia lactea A.Massal. (1852)

Characteristics of genus Blastodesmia include paraphyses in the hamathecium, transversely septate ascospores that are grey to brown in colour, and pyrenocarp-type ascomata with carbonized ascoma walls. The ascospores are mostly 37–47 μm long and have a constriction at the septa.
