= Xenus lithophylli =

Scientific classification
- Domain: Eukaryota
- Kingdom: Fungi
- Division: Ascomycota
- Class: Eurotiomycetes
- Order: Pyrenulales
- Genus: Xenus; Kohlm. & Volkm.-Kohlm.
- Species: X. lithophylli

Binomial name
- Xenus lithophylli Kohlm. & Volkm.-Kohlm.

Single-species genus of lichen

Xenus lithophylli is a species of lichenized ascomycete fungus discovered in 1992, composing the entire monotypic genus Xenus. It is found parasiting the calcified algae Lithophyllum, and lives attached to corals in Belize, in the Caribbean.

This species is currently under incertae sedis in the order Pyrenulales.
