= Franz Gerhard Eschweiler =

German botanist (1796–1831)

- Born: 1796; Cologne, Holy Roman Empire
- Died: 4 July 1831 (aged 34–35)
- Education: University of Landshut
- Scientific career
- Fields: Botany
- Author abbrev. (botany): Eschw.

Franz Gerhard Eschweiler (1796 – 4 July 1831) was a German botanist.

Eschweiler was born in Cologne in 1796, the son of a district judge. After graduating from high school in Cologne, he first studied law in Bonn, but then switched to natural sciences and continued his studies at the University of Landshut. There he received his doctorate in medicine in 1824.

He then turned to botany and worked on the material collected by Carl Friedrich Philipp von Martius in Brazil. In recognition of this collaboration, the Brazilian shrub genus Eschweilera was named after him.

Eschweiler worked in the Regensburg Botanical Society and from 1827 received a teaching position as a lecturer in natural history at the Royal Lyceum in Regensburg. This activity had to be interrupted several times due to his deteriorating health, and he died on 4 July 1831.

== See also ==
- Category:Taxa named by Franz Gerhard Eschweiler
