= Pyrgillus =

Scientific classification
- Domain: Eukaryota
- Kingdom: Fungi
- Division: Ascomycota
- Class: Eurotiomycetes
- Order: Pyrenulales
- Family: Pyrenulaceae
- Genus: Pyrgillus; Nyl. (1858)

Type species
- Pyrgillus americanus Nyl. (1860)

Synonyms
- Pyrgillocarpon Nádv. (1942); Pyrgillomyces Cif. & Tomas. (1953); Pyrgillocarpon Nádv. ex Tibell (1984)

Genus of lichen-forming fungi

Pyrgillus is a genus of lichen-forming fungi in the family Pyrenulaceae. The genus was circumscribed by the Finnish lichenologist William Nylander in 1858.

== Species ==
- Pyrgillus americanus Nyl. (1860)
- Pyrgillus aurantiacus Aptroot & M.Cáceres (2018)
- Pyrgillus cambodiensis Kashiw., K.H.Moon & Aptroot (2012)
- Pyrgillus cubanus Nyl. (1876)
- Pyrgillus fuscus Aptroot (1991)
- Pyrgillus idukkiensis Kr.P.Singh & Pushpi Singh (2012)
- Pyrgillus indicus (Kremp.) Aptroot (1991)
- Pyrgillus javanicus (Mont. & Bosch) Nyl. (1858)
- Pyrgillus rufus Aptroot & M.Cáceres (2018)
- Pyrgillus tibellii Kr.P.Singh & Pushpi Singh (2012)
