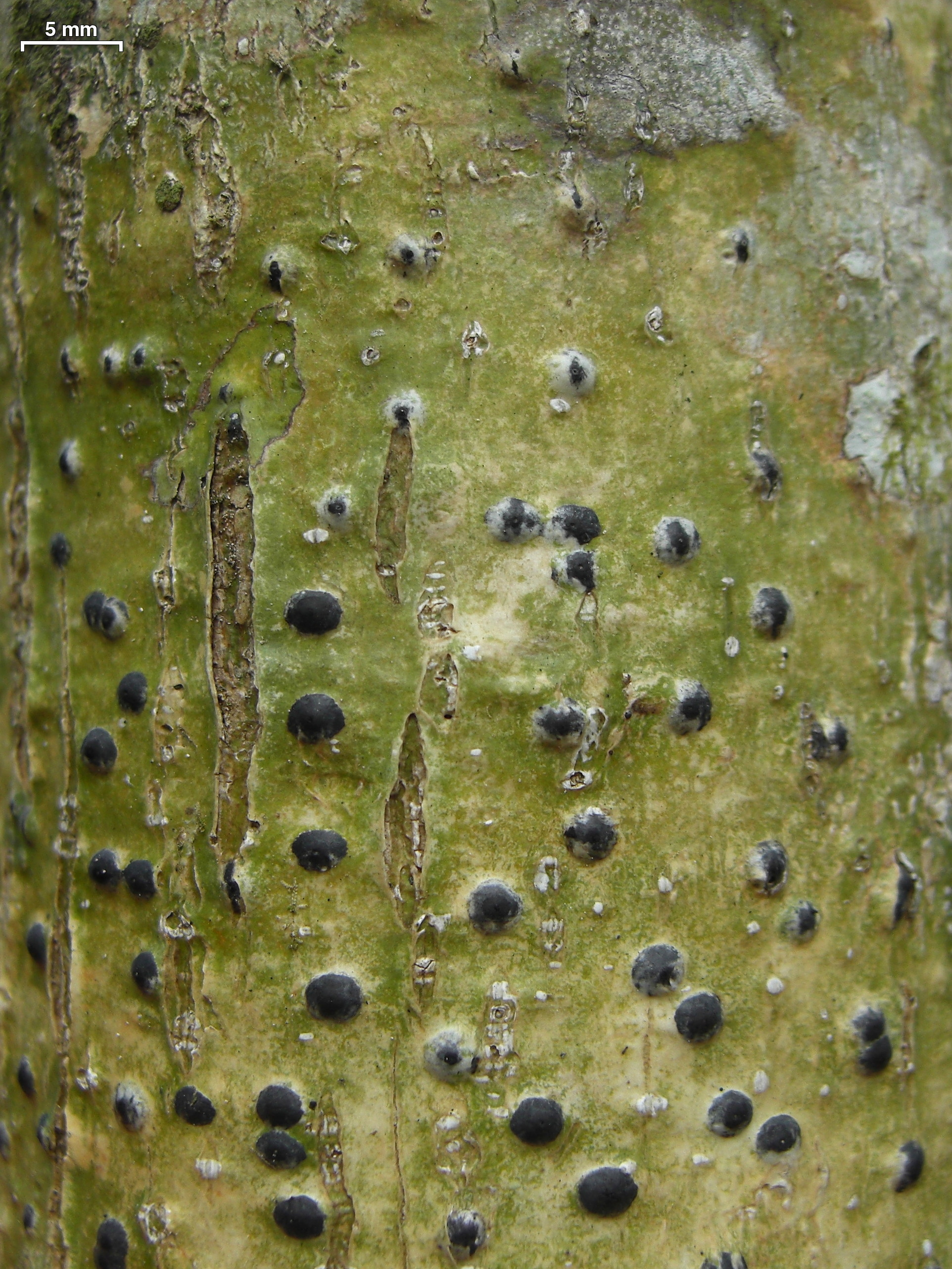
- Anthracothecium prasinum

Scientific classification
- Kingdom: Fungi
- Division: Ascomycota
- Class: Eurotiomycetes
- Order: Pyrenulales
- Family: Pyrenulaceae
- Genus: Anthracothecium; Hampe ex A.Massal. (1860)

Type species
- Anthracothecium doleschallii A.Massal. (1871)

Species
- See text

Synonyms
- Phaeodictyon M.Choisy (1929)

= Anthracothecium =

Genus of lichen-forming fungi

Anthracothecium is a genus of lichen-forming fungi in the family Pyrenulaceae. It comprises five species of crustose, bark-dwelling, pyrenocarpous lichens in the tropics and subtropics, and that in the current sense the genus is diagnosed by young ascospores that are euseptate (true septa) and remain mostly euseptate when mature, contrasting with Pyrenula, where distosepta and thickened endospore is the norm. The ascomata (fruiting bodies) are carbonised (blackened and charcoal-like), usually simple or aggregated in predictable ways, and ostioles may be apical or lateral depending on species.

== Taxonomy ==
The genus Anthracothecium was established in the mid-19th century by Abramo Bartolommeo Massalongo from material collected by Georg Ernst Ludwig Hampe. Modern usage is narrower: André Aptroot’s world key re-examined types, keyed all published names and reduced the genus to five accepted, pantropical species, reallocating most nineteenth- and twentieth-century names to other pyrenocarpous genera, chiefly Pyrenula. In this framework Anthracothecium is diagnosed chiefly by spore anatomy—young ascospores are euseptate and remain mainly so at maturity with rectangular lumina—whereas Pyrenula has distoseptate spores with a thickened endospore; organisation of the perithecioid ascomata (typically carbonised, with apical or lateral ostioles) and the number of ascospores per ascus are auxiliary characters, but septation provides the most reliable separation of the two genera.

Under this circumscription, Aptroot accepted five species. He formalised the combination Anthracothecium interlatens and proposed that Massalongo's A. doleschallii is best treated as a synonym of A. macrosporum. The remaining names historically placed in Anthracothecium, including widely cited species such as A. thwaitesii, A. variolosum, A. subvariolosum, A. sinapispermum, and many more, are assigned to Pyrenula (or, less often, to other genera) with notes where the placement is tentative.

Aptroot also comments on family-level context: available phylogenetic trees suggest that Pyrenula may be paraphyletic with several morphologically coherent small genera (including Anthracothecium) nested within it.

== Habitat and distribution ==
Species of Anthracothecium are crustose lichens that grow on bark in shaded and usually humid environments. They are characteristically found on smooth tree trunks in tropical and subtropical forests. The genus has a pantropical distribution, with species recorded from regions as far apart as Australasia, Africa, Asia, and the Americas. Within this broad range, most species are relatively uncommon, although a few, such as A. prasinum and A. macrosporum, occur more widely across multiple continents.

== Species ==
Aptroot's 2021 global treatment of Pyrenulaceae accepted five species in Anthracothecium:

- Anthracothecium australiense (Müll.Arg.) Aptroot (1997) – pantropical
- Anthracothecium gregale (C.Knight) Aptroot (2007) – Australasian; possibly also Africa
- Anthracothecium interlatens (Nyl.) Aptroot (2011) – pantropical
- Anthracothecium macrosporum (Hepp) Müll.Arg. (1880) – pantropical
- Anthracothecium prasinum (Eschw.) R.C.Harris (1987) – pantropical
