= Pseudocyphella =

Terminology in lichen morphology

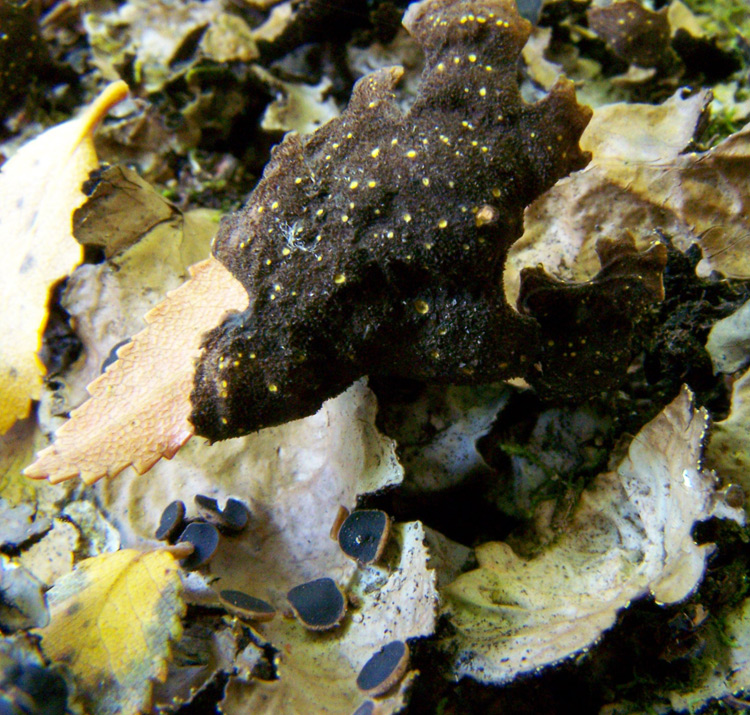
Yellow pseudocyphellea on the underside of a species of Pseudocyphellaria in Patagonia

Pseudocyphellae (singular pseudocyphella) are structures in lichens that appear as tiny pores on the outer surface (the cortex) of the lichen. They are caused when there is a break in the cortex of the lichen, and the medullary hyphae extend to the surface. Pseudocyphellae are the same colour as the medulla of the lichen, which is generally white, but can be yellow in some species of Pseudocyphellaria and in Bryoria fremontii. The presence/absence, abundance, colour, and shape of pseudocyphellae can all be diagnostic features used to identify different species. They facilitate gas exchange through the surface of the lichen, and may provide an adaptive advantage in temperate environments.

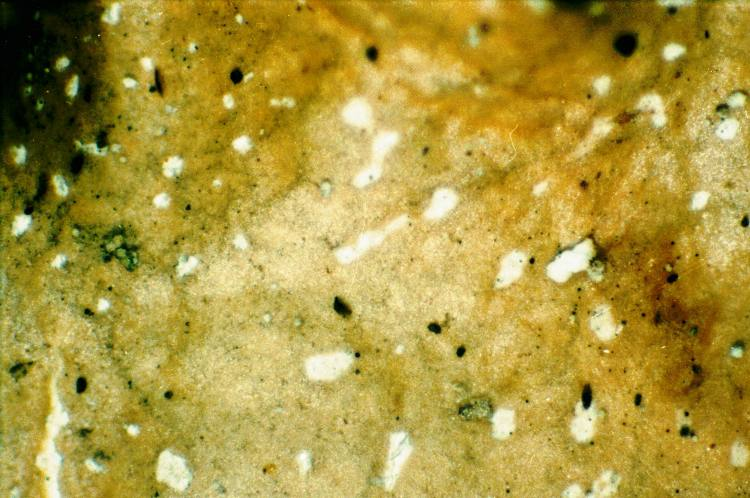
White pseudocyphellae on the upper surface of a lobe of Cetrelia cetrarioides
