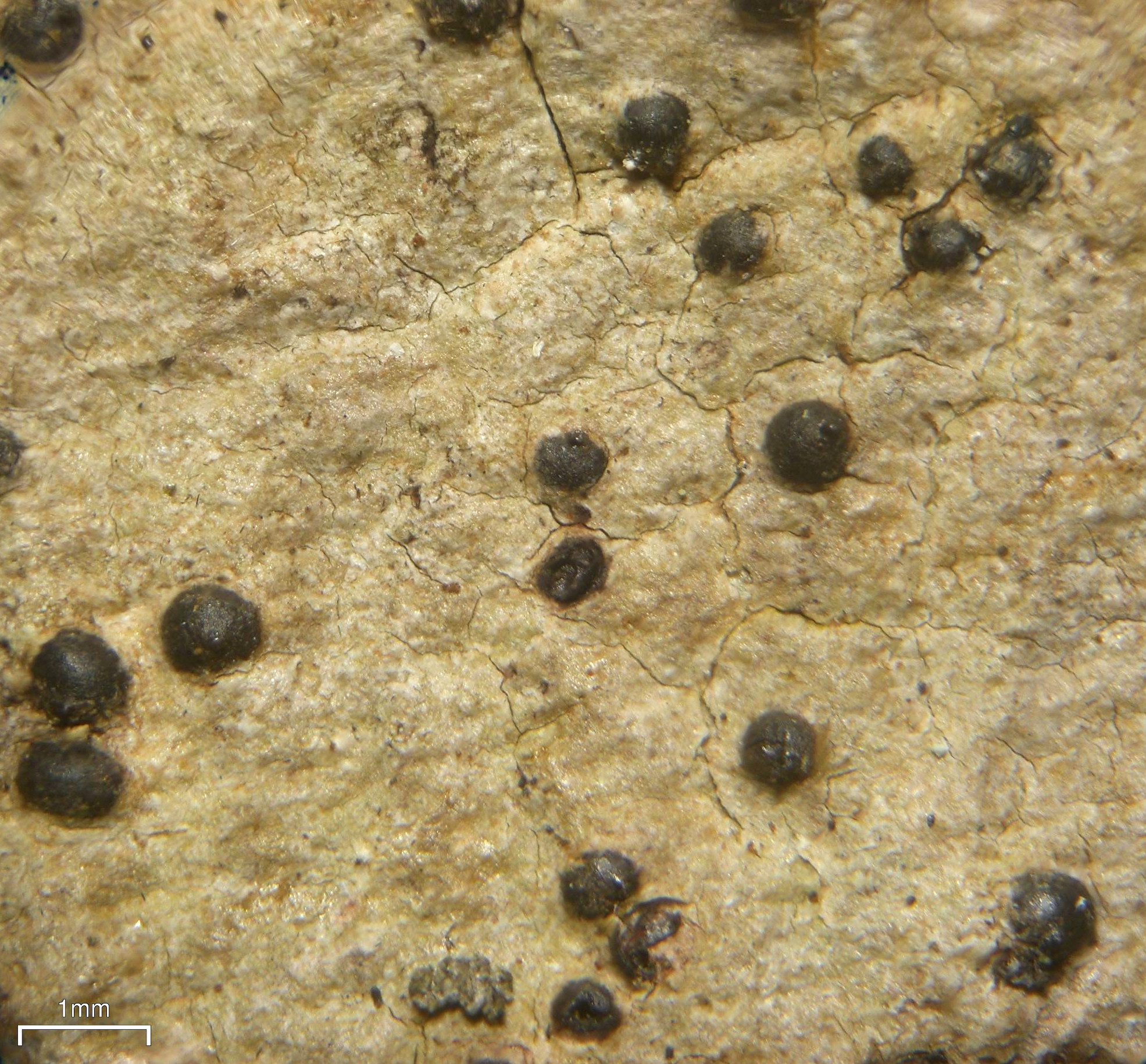
- Lithothelium hyalosporum showing its pale crustose thallus and black perithecia

Scientific classification
- Kingdom: Fungi
- Division: Ascomycota
- Class: Eurotiomycetes
- Order: Pyrenulales
- Family: Pyrenulaceae; Rabenh. (1870)

Type genus
- Pyrenula Ach. (1814)

Genera
- See text

= Pyrenulaceae =

Family of mostly lichen-forming fungi

The Pyrenulaceae are a family of mostly lichen-forming fungi in the order Pyrenulales, though a few members are secondarily non-lichenized. They form thin crusts on bark and, less often, on rock, and partner with species from the green algal genus Trentepohlia. The family is characterized by flask-shaped fruiting bodies (perithecia) that typically open through a pore, and by ascospores whose internal walls form distinctive rounded to diamond-shaped chambers. The number of accepted genera varies among sources—recent phylogenetic treatments have sampled about 13, while broader taxonomic outlines list up to 16—and the Catalogue of Life includes around 395 described species as of 2026, with modelling estimates suggesting a true total of roughly 440 worldwide. Under current circumscription, the family is dominated by Pyrenula, which accounts for about two-thirds of the known species. The family was established by Gottlob Ludwig Rabenhorst in 1870, and its generic boundaries have been substantially revised since, most recently through molecular phylogenetic studies that have shown several traditionally recognized genera to be nested within Pyrenula.

Together with Graphidaceae and Trypetheliaceae, Pyrenulaceae form one of the three most species-rich tropical microlichen families. They are found mainly in humid tropical forests, where they typically grow on smooth, shaded bark in lowland to lower montane settings. Although a few species extend into temperate regions, diversity is overwhelmingly tropical. Recent revisionary work suggests that many apparently widespread species are actually complexes of narrower taxa, and that documented species richness is still rising quickly.

== Systematics ==
=== Historical taxonomy ===
The family Pyrenulaceae was introduced by the German lichenologist Gottlob Ludwig Rabenhorst in 1870 in his treatment of the pyrenocarpous lichens, which he defined by their wart-like fruiting bodies opening through a pore at the summit. His concept of the family was based on lichens with mostly immersed to emergent, usually hemispherical fruiting bodies enclosed by a dark wall, and he included the genera Microthelia, Acrocordia, Arthopyrenia, Leptorhaphis, and Pyrenula.

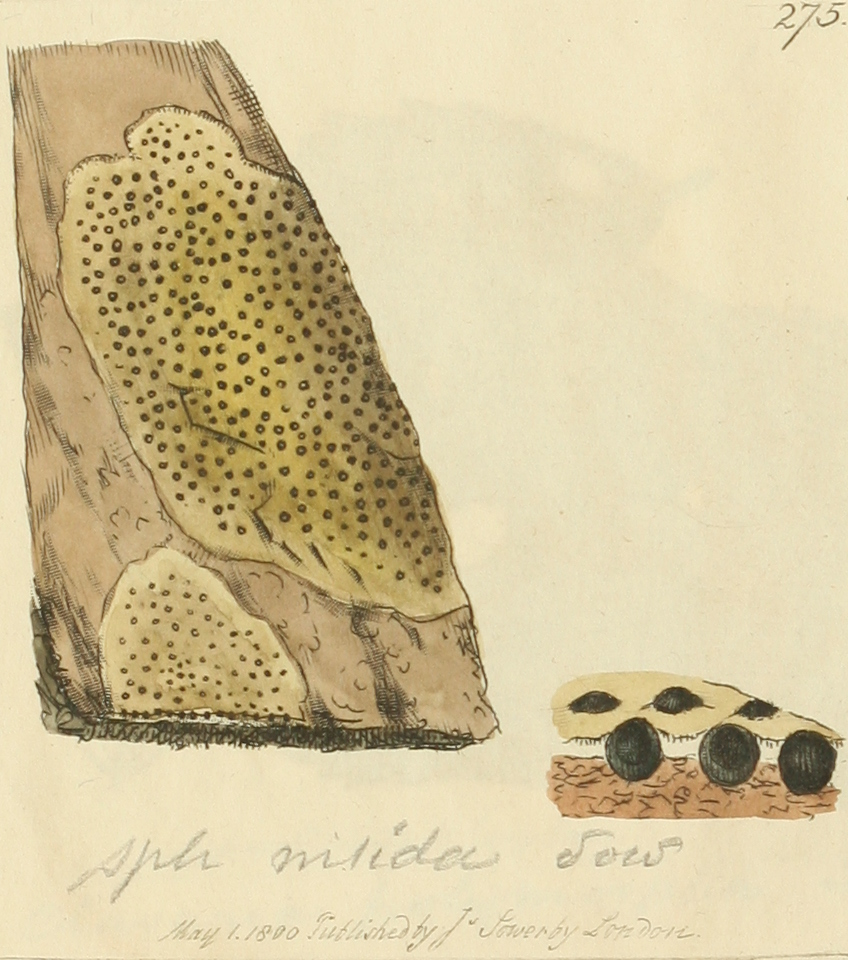
Plate of Sphaeria nitida from James Sowerby's Coloured Figures of English Fungi or Mushrooms (1800), illustrating the basionym of Pyrenula nitida, the type species of the type genus of Pyrenulaceae

At the ordinal level, Pyrenulaceae is placed in Pyrenulales, a name first used by Bruce Fink in 1915 and later validated by Hawksworth and Eriksson in 1986. The ordinal placement of the family was debated through the 1980s and 1990s: Richard Harris argued in 1989 that Pyrenulaceae belonged with non-lichenized families in Melanommatales rather than in a separate Pyrenulales, which he saw as preserving an artificial divide between lichenized and non-lichenized fungi, while Eriksson and Winka in 1997 kept the order provisionally separate from a broadly defined Dothideales pending better molecular sampling. Subsequent multigene phylogenetic studies resolved the question by placing Pyrenulales in the subclass Chaetothyriomycetidae within Eurotiomycetes, a position retained in current classifications.

Harris's 1989 treatment showed that generic boundaries in Pyrenulaceae were already being reconsidered before molecular data became available. In his account of the eastern North American flora, he accepted a narrower Anthracothecium and reduced several previously recognized genera, including Melanotheca, Mycopyrenula, Parmentaria, Pleurotheliopsis, and Pyrenastrum, to synonymy under Pyrenula. He argued that characters such as ostiole orientation, ostiole fusion, and broad ascospore types had been overemphasized in older classifications and often produced artificial groupings.

A major pre-molecular treatment of the family was André Aptroot's 1991 monograph, which revised Pyrenulaceae largely through cladistic analysis of morphological characters. Reviewing the work in 1993, Ove Eriksson noted that Aptroot accepted eight genera in the family, including the newly proposed Clypeopyrenis, Distopyrenis, Mazaediothecium, and Pyrenowilmsia, but also emphasized that the group remained incompletely known and that molecular data would be needed to test and refine this classification.

By the late 1990s, attempts to integrate lichenized and non-lichenized pyrenocarpous fungi were already reshaping ideas about Pyrenulaceae. In a 1998 review, André Aptroot argued that the traditional Pyrenulales, taken in a broad sense, probably formed a natural group and distinguished them from the Pleosporales by their heavily carbonized ascoma wall, which is typically composed of interwoven hyphae (textura intricata), rather than angular, jigsaw-like cells (textura angularis). He also treated Pyrenulaceae as including both lichenized and secondarily non-lichenized elements, citing Distopyrenis and the non-lichenized Pyrenula coryli as examples of lineages that complicated older, more rigid distinctions between lichen and fungus classification.

=== Molecular phylogenetics ===
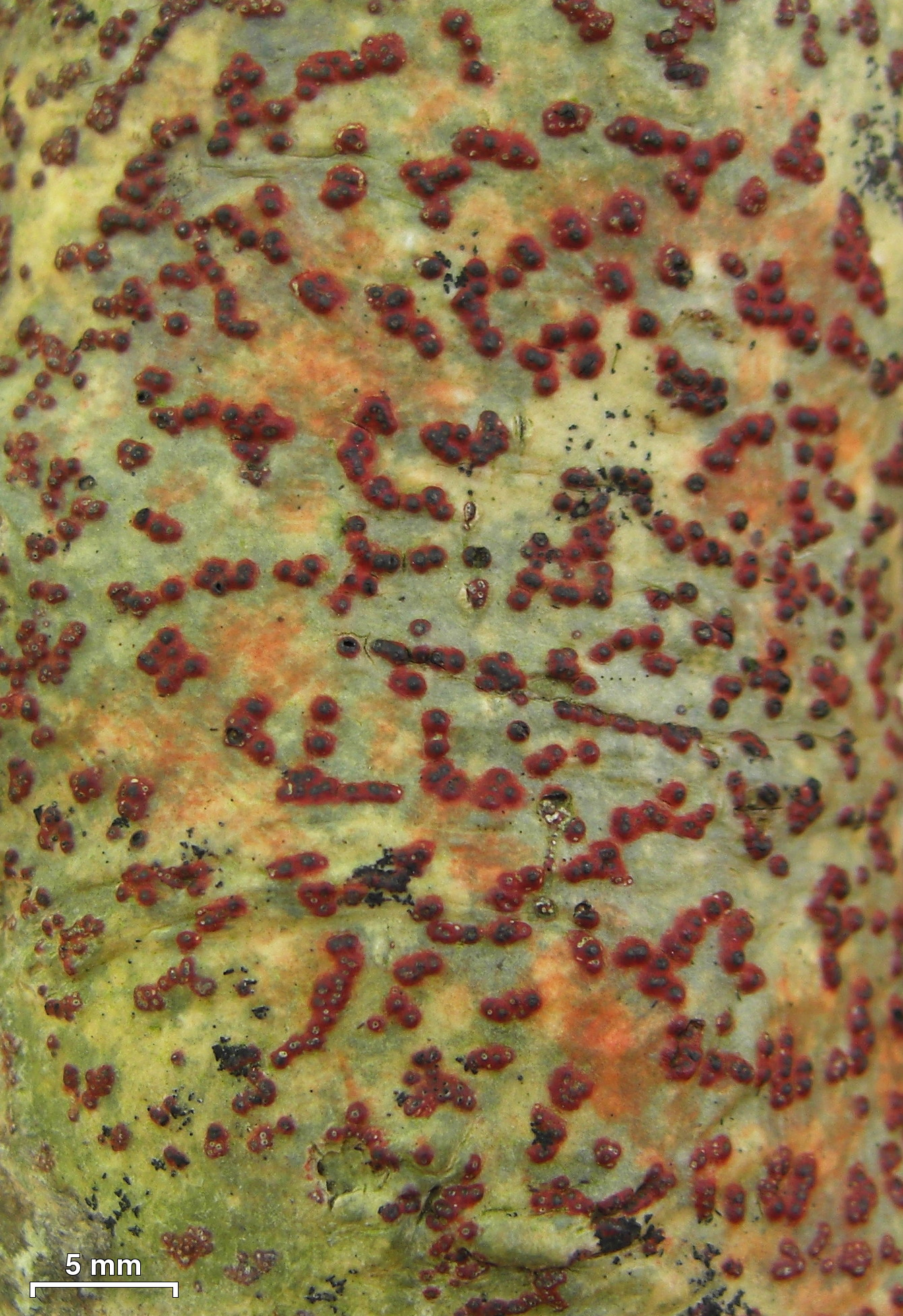
Pyrenula cruenta on bark in the Outer Banks of North Carolina, showing its distinctive red, pseudostromatic ascomata

Even before broad molecular sampling was available, limited phylogenetic evidence already suggested that Anthracothecium, Granulopyrenis, and Pyrgillus might be nested within Pyrenula as traditionally circumscribed, and that wider species sampling would be needed before the generic classification could be revised with confidence.

The first molecular study focused specifically on the family, published in 2012, used three molecular markers (nrLSU, mtSSU, and ITS) and sequence data from 21 taxa. It recovered two strongly supported lineages within the family and confirmed that Pyrenula in its broad sense was not monophyletic. Many characters traditionally used in generic classification—including ascospore colour and septation, locule structure, secondary chemistry, hamathecium features, and ostiole position—did not correspond well to these two groups, although pseudocyphellae were confined to one of them. A 2013 species-level study illustrated this mismatch further: despite its bright red, pseudostromatic, trypethelioid ascomata and unusual pigment chemistry, Pyrenula sanguinea was placed within Pyrenula as the sister species of P. cruenta.

A more comprehensive three-gene phylogeny sampling 100 taxa, published in 2016, confirmed these results. Pyrenulaceae was strongly supported as monophyletic, but Pyrenula in its traditional sense was not: Anthracothecium, Lithothelium (itself non-monophyletic), and Pyrgillus all proved to be nested within it. The analysis resolved two well-supported clades—Group 1, characterized by the usual presence of thalline pseudocyphellae (with the notable exception of Anthracothecium), and Group 2, which lacks them—with Granulopyrenis seawardii tentatively placed as the earliest-diverging lineage. Because broad taxon and gene sampling remained incomplete, the authors stopped short of formal taxonomic changes but concluded that generic delimitation within the family will need substantial revision.

== Description ==
Members of the Pyrenulaceae are lichen-forming fungi with crustose thalli that associate with the green algal photobiont Trentepohlia, although some species are non-lichenized. Like the related families Trypetheliaceae and Monoblastiaceae, they produce their spores in flask-shaped fruiting bodies (perithecia) rather than in the open, cup-like discs (apothecia) found in many other lichen families. The thallus is usually a thin crust closely attached to the substrate, so its appearance is often influenced by the bark on which it grows. Useful characters include whether the thallus is corticate, whether it bears pseudocyphellae, how it reacts under ultraviolet light, and whether it contains anthraquinone pigments.

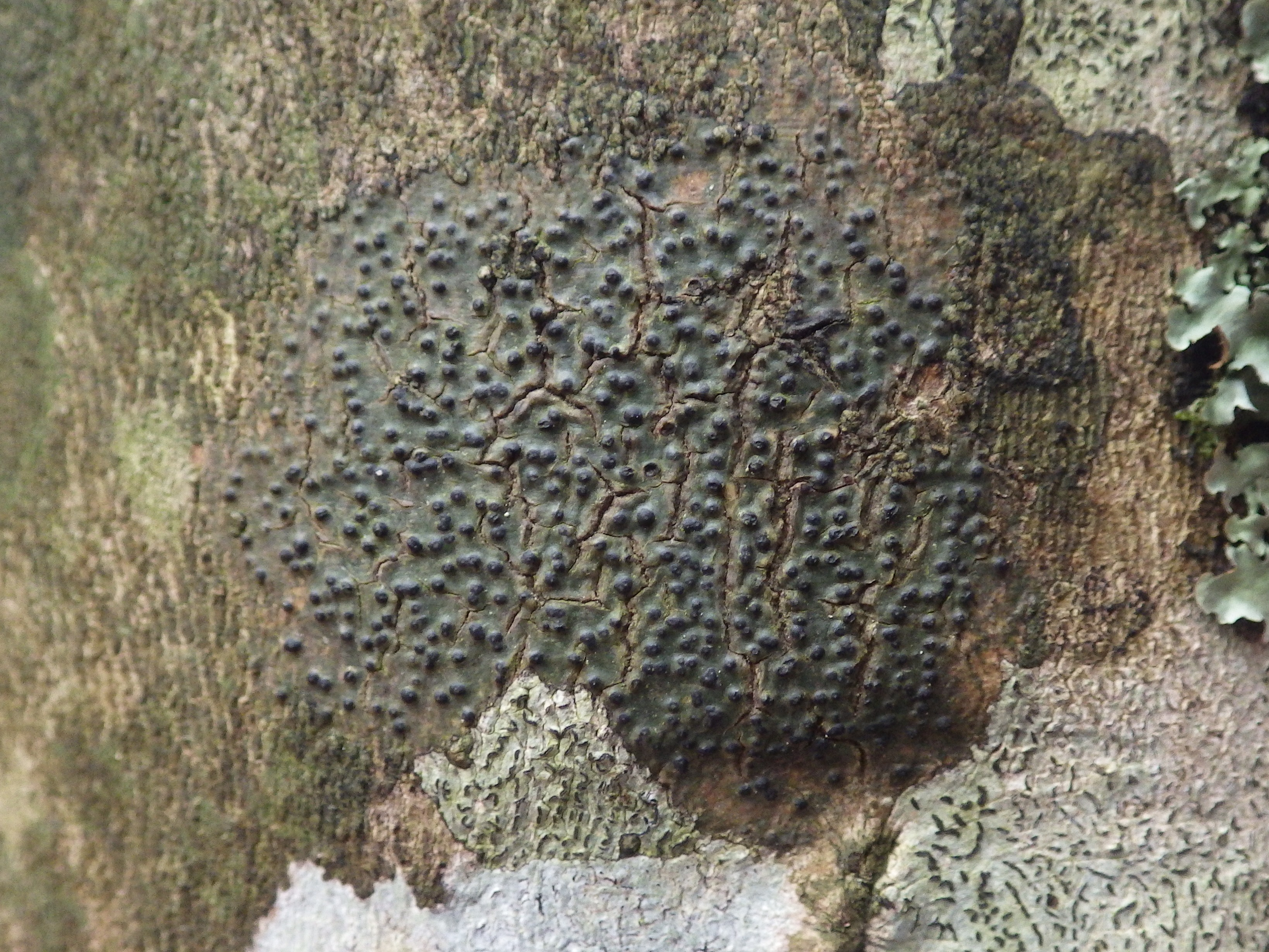
Pyrenula macrospora on bark in Sintra, Portugal

The ascomata (fruiting bodies) are flask-shaped (perithecioid), each opening through a pore (ostiole) at the top, to one side, or at a lateral position. They may occur singly, in groups, or fused side by side so that several share a single opening; in the unusual genera Pyrgillus and Mazaediothecium, they instead break down into a powdery mass (becoming mazediate). The fruiting-body wall is uniformly blackened (carbonized), and is usually surrounded by a protective outer shell (involucrellum), often with a collar of thallus tissue at the rim (thalline margin). The inner wall (excipulum) is made up of elongated, interwoven cells (prosoplectenchyma) and ranges from brown to black. The spore-bearing tissue (hamathecium) consists of unbranched sterile threads (paraphyses) that are sometimes densely scattered with minute oil droplets, and it stains weakly with iodine (hemiamyloid).

The asci (spore sacs) are fissitunicate (with a double wall that splits during spore release), club-shaped (clavate) to cylindrical, and have an apical thickening (tholus) with an internal ocular chamber; they do not stain with iodine. Each ascus typically contains eight ascospores, though the number is sometimes reduced to two to four, or just one. The spores are among the most informative characters at species level: they are spindle-shaped (fusiform) to ellipsoid, with cross-walls (transversely septate) to a more complex grid-like pattern (muriform). In most species, the inner spore wall (endospore) forms thickened internal divisions (distosepta) that create rounded to diamond-shaped chambers (lumina). The spores are usually brown, rarely red-brown or colourless (hyaline), and do not react with iodine. Asexual reproduction occurs through pycnidia, which produce thread-like to sickle-shaped (falcate), colourless, undivided conidia. Most species lack secondary metabolites, although anthraquinones and lichexanthone are present in some.

== Diversity and species richness ==
Pyrenulaceae, together with Graphidaceae and Trypetheliaceae, make up the "big three" most species-rich tropical microlichen families. A global grid-based analysis published in 2020 recognized 307 described species in 13 genera and estimated that the family actually comprises about 441 species worldwide (uncertainty range roughly 395–453), suggesting that more than 40% of its diversity remained undocumented at that time. Most of that predicted richness was tropical: about 416 species were inferred for tropical regions, whereas only 25 known species appeared to be confined to temperate areas. The same study found that Pyrenulaceae are substantially less diverse than Trypetheliaceae (estimated at about 800 species) or Graphidaceae (about 3,660), a difference the authors attributed to contrasting diversification rates and morphological disparity rather than to differences in evolutionary age.

Documented diversity is still rising quickly. By 2025, the number of recognized species in Pyrenula alone had increased by nearly 40% in just seven years, owing both to newly discovered taxa and to the splitting of formerly broad species concepts. Recent species-level revisions have shown that fine morphological and chemical characters—including the presence and position of lichexanthone, the degree and distribution of hamathecium inspersion, the extent to which perithecia are immersed or emergent, and detailed ascospore structure—can be more informative than older, broader species concepts allowed.

Part of this growth stems from the re-examination of species that appear unusually widespread in the tropics, such as Pyrenula mamillana, P. anomala, P. quassiicola, P. aspistea, P. confinis, and Pyrgillus javanicus. Multi-specimen sampling has shown several of these to be non-monophyletic: P. mamillana splits into three lineages, P. quassiicola resolves into at least four, P. thelomorpha does not cluster with its Australian and Vietnamese conspecific, and P. minor nests within P. aspistea. These results suggest that molecular delimitation will narrow the ranges of many currently broad species and raise the true global total.

Revisionary work on the Pyrenula andina–P. mastophoroides complex offers a concrete example: re-examination of herbarium material from the neotropics and Papua New Guinea showed that collections previously assigned to those two names actually represented 17 taxa, of which eight were new to science. Only the type material corresponded to P. andina and P. mastophoroides in the strict sense.

== Distribution and ecology ==
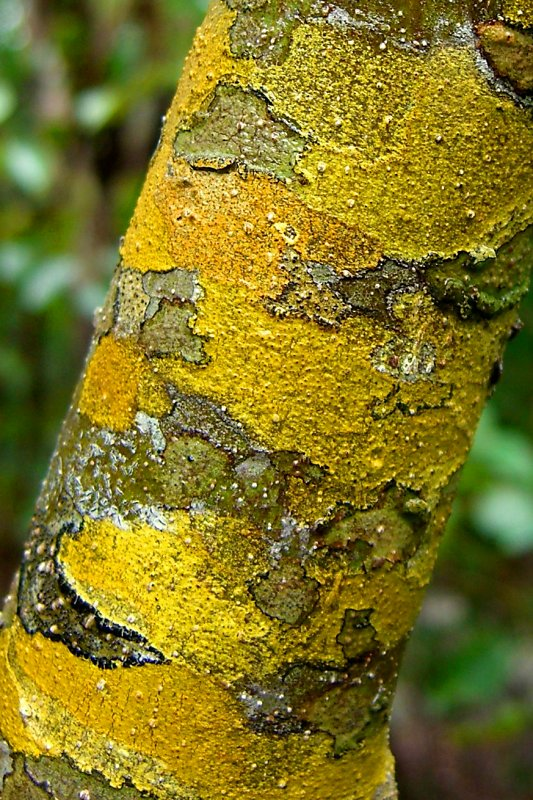
The "yellow pox lichen", Pyrenula ochraceoflavens, on the bark of a tree in the Florida Keys

Pyrenulaceae are an essentially tropical family, favouring shaded to semi-exposed microhabitats on smooth bark in lowland to lower montane forests, mostly below about 1,000 m elevation. Most species are corticolous and partner with the green algal photobiont Trentepohlia; a few are lichenicolous (lichen-dwelling) or non-lichenized. Observed diversity is highest in north-eastern Brazil and north-eastern India, while modelled hotspots shift to wetter rainforest belts in the eastern Amazon and in Myanmar and Thailand. Of the 62 species with extratropical records, 25 appear to be temperate-restricted; examples include Pyrenula nitidella, P. laevigata, Lithothelium phaeosporum, and Pyrgillus javanicus. In eastern North America, Pyrenula is most diverse in the subtropical and tropical parts of Florida and becomes progressively less diverse farther north.

In the Malesian region, pyrenulaceous lichens are a conspicuous component of tropical epiphyte communities. Known species richness and local endemism are highest in Australia and Papua New Guinea, while several potentially species-rich areas remain too poorly collected for firm comparison; species apparently confined to two adjacent regions are unexpectedly rare, even where the broader pyrenocarpous lichen floras show obvious similarities.

The family can also be significantly under-recorded outside the tropics. A survey of permanent vegetation plots in the Auckland Region added five species of Pyrenula to the New Zealand lichen biota, raising the national total from 10 to 15, and subsequent work has added several more. Similarly, a 2017 survey of Cát Tiên National Park in southern Vietnam reported five Pyrenulaceae species as new to the country, from warm, humid lowland forest on bark.

== Genera ==
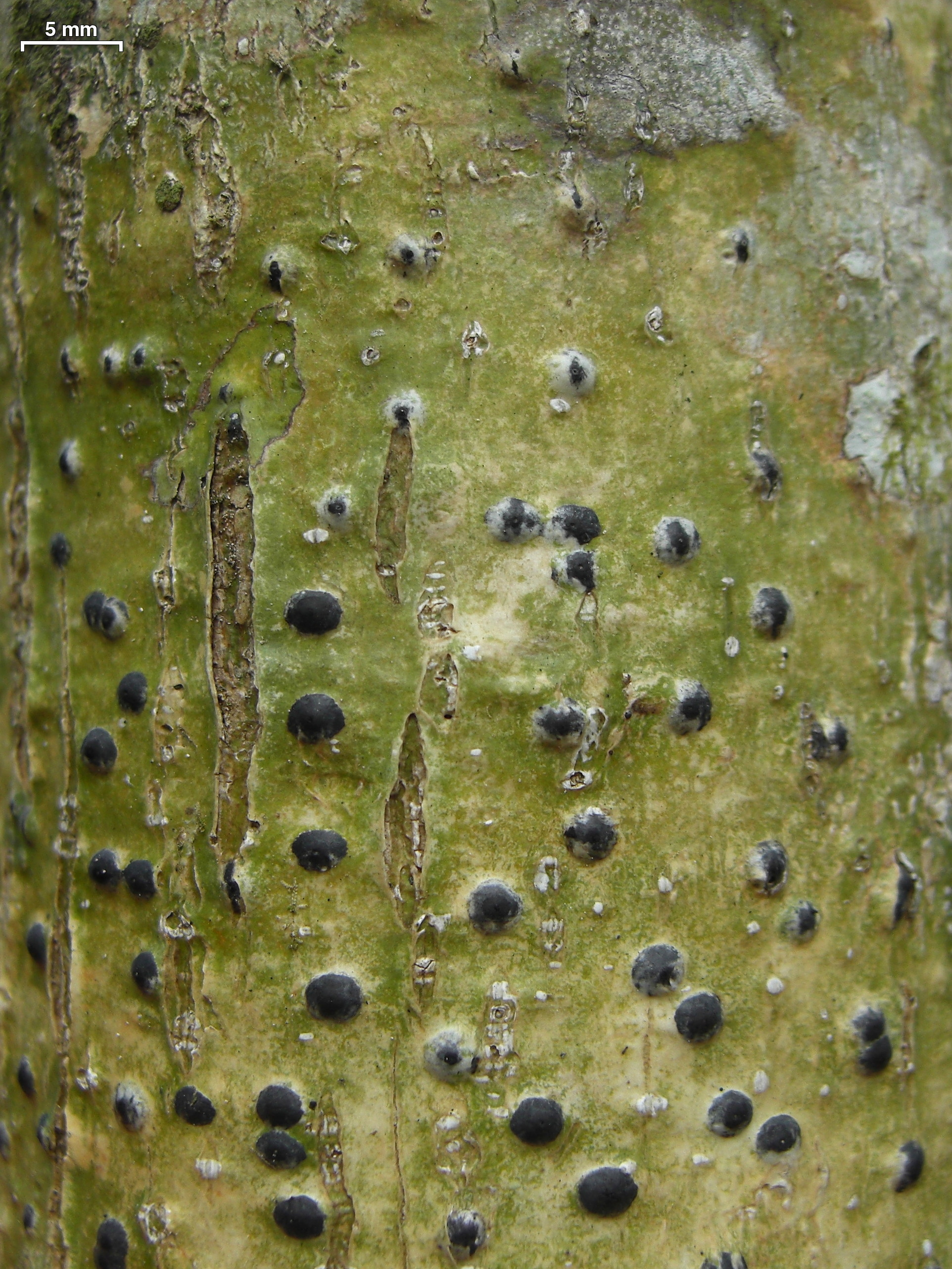
Close view of Anthracothecium prasinum on bark, with a green thallus and black perithecia

The 2016 three-gene phylogeny by Gueidan and colleagues sampled 13 genera, but broader taxonomic outlines recognize additional names: the 2024 Outline of Fungi lists 16 genera in the family, several of which (Blastodesmia, Melanothecopsis, Serusiauxia) were not included in that phylogenetic framework and remain poorly integrated into the molecular classification. The family is dominated by Pyrenula, which accounts for about 265 of the roughly 395 species listed in the Catalogue of Life as of 2026. Genera with wide distributions include Anthracothecium, Distopyrenis, Granulopyrenis, Lithothelium, Mazaediothecium, Parapyrenis, Pyrgillus, and Sulcopyrenula; others are more localized, for example Clypeopyrenis (Central and South America), Lacrymospora (Madagascar), Pyrenographa (Palaeotropics), and Pyrenowilmsia (South Africa).

The following genera are assigned to the family in the 2024 Outline. Species counts follow the Catalogue of Life; distribution notes are from Gueidan and colleagues. Estimates vary among sources because generic boundaries in the family remain unsettled.

- Anthracothecium Hampe ex A.Massal. (1860) – 31 spp.; widespread, mainly tropical
- Blastodesmia A.Massal. (1852) – 1 sp.
- Clypeopyrenis Aptroot (1991) – 2 spp.; Central and South America
- Distopyrenis Aptroot (1991) – 6 spp.; widespread, tropical (non-lichenised)
- Granulopyrenis Aptroot (1991) – 6 spp.; widespread, tropical
- Lacrymospora Aptroot (1991) – 1 sp.
- Lithothelium Müll.Arg. (1885) – 28 spp.; widespread, tropical
- Mazaediothecium Aptroot (1991) – 3 spp.; Costa Rica, Papua New Guinea, Malaysia
- Melanothecopsis C.W.Dodge (1967) – 4 spp.
- Parapyrenis Aptroot (1991) – 8 spp.; widespread, tropical
- Pyrenographa Aptroot (1991) – 3 spp.
- Pyrenowilmsia R.C.Harris & Aptroot (1991) – 1 sp.; South Africa
- Pyrenula Ach. (1814) – 265 spp.; widespread, mainly tropical
- Pyrgillus Nyl. (1858) – 11 spp.; widespread, pantropical
- Serusiauxia Ertz & Diederich (2020) – 1 sp.
- Sulcopyrenula H.Harada (1999) – 5 spp.; widespread, mainly tropical

=== Doubtful or excluded genera ===
Micromma was proposed by Massalongo in 1860 to contain the single species Micromma coccorum; some sources include the little-known genus in the Pyrenulaceae. MycoBank suggests it is synonymous with Pyrenula. While some sources include Daruvedia as a member of the family, a later reassessment treated it instead as a non-lichenized dothideomycete of uncertain family placement, provisionally referable to Pleosporales, so its inclusion in Pyrenulaceae is doubtful.
