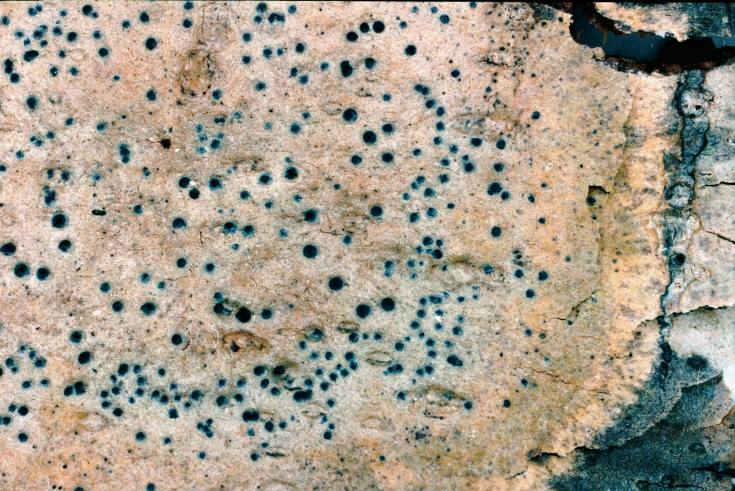
- Pyrenula pseudobufonia

Scientific classification
- Kingdom: Fungi
- Division: Ascomycota
- Class: Eurotiomycetes
- Order: Pyrenulales
- Family: Pyrenulaceae
- Genus: Pyrenula; Ach. (1814)

Type species
- Pyrenula nitida (Weigel) Ach. (1814)

Synonyms
- Pyrenastrum Eschw. (1824); Parathelium Nyl. (1862); Pleurothelium Müll.Arg. (1877); Heufleridium Müll.Arg. (1883); Anthracothecomyces Cif. & Tomas. (1953); Pyrenulomyces E.A.Thomas ex Cif. & Tomas. (1953); Melanothecopsis C.W.Dodge (1967)

= Pyrenula =

Genus of lichen-forming fungi

Pyrenula is a genus of lichen-forming fungi in the family Pyrenulaceae. The genus has a widespread distribution, especially in tropical regions, and contains about 200 species. Most species grow on bark in moist, shaded habitats, especially in tropical regions. They usually form thin crusts on the surface and produce small black spore-bearing structures that are partly embedded in the lichen body. Research has shown that some species names in Pyrenula were once applied too broadly, and that the boundaries of the genus itself may still need refinement.

== Taxonomy ==
The genus was circumscribed in 1814 by Erik Acharius. Acharius distinguished Pyrenula by its crustose thallus that forms a flat, closely attached, uniform crust, and its characteristic wart-like structures that either protrude from or encircle the fruiting bodies. The genus is characterized by simple, thick-walled, black perithecia with papillate ostioles, and spherical chambers containing a cellular mass that becomes powdery at maturity.

A 2012 world key to Pyrenula and allied genera by André Aptroot recognized 169 accepted species in Pyrenula at that time, and found that many of them occur across widely separated tropical regions rather than being confined to a single continent. Aptroot wrote that revisions from areas such as Costa Rica, the Seychelles, Papua New Guinea and Australia revealed a substantial shared pantropical element in the genus, with comparatively fewer species appearing to be narrowly local. He also noted that the generic limits then in use within Pyrenulaceae were probably not entirely natural, because the limited phylogenetic evidence available suggested that some small genera might be nested within Pyrenula, leaving the genus paraphyletic in its traditional broad circumscription.

Subsequent work has shown that Pyrenula is the dominant genus of the family Pyrenulaceae, containing the majority of its more than 300 described species, many of them tropical microlichens. A detailed revision of material assigned to P. andina and P. mastophoroides demonstrated that these names had been used for a heterogeneous assemblage of at least 17 taxa: only the type collections actually represent those two species, while other specimens proved to be misidentifications, previously overlooked species, or taxa wrongly placed in synonymy. By combining characters such as thallus and perithecial morphology (including the presence of pseudocyphellae, the degree of immersion and orientation of the ostioles), the structure and inspersion of the hamathecium, ascospore size and type, and the presence and position of lichexanthone, that study reinstated P. flavicans from synonymy and described eight additional species, and argued for a much narrower application of species names within the genus.

== Description ==
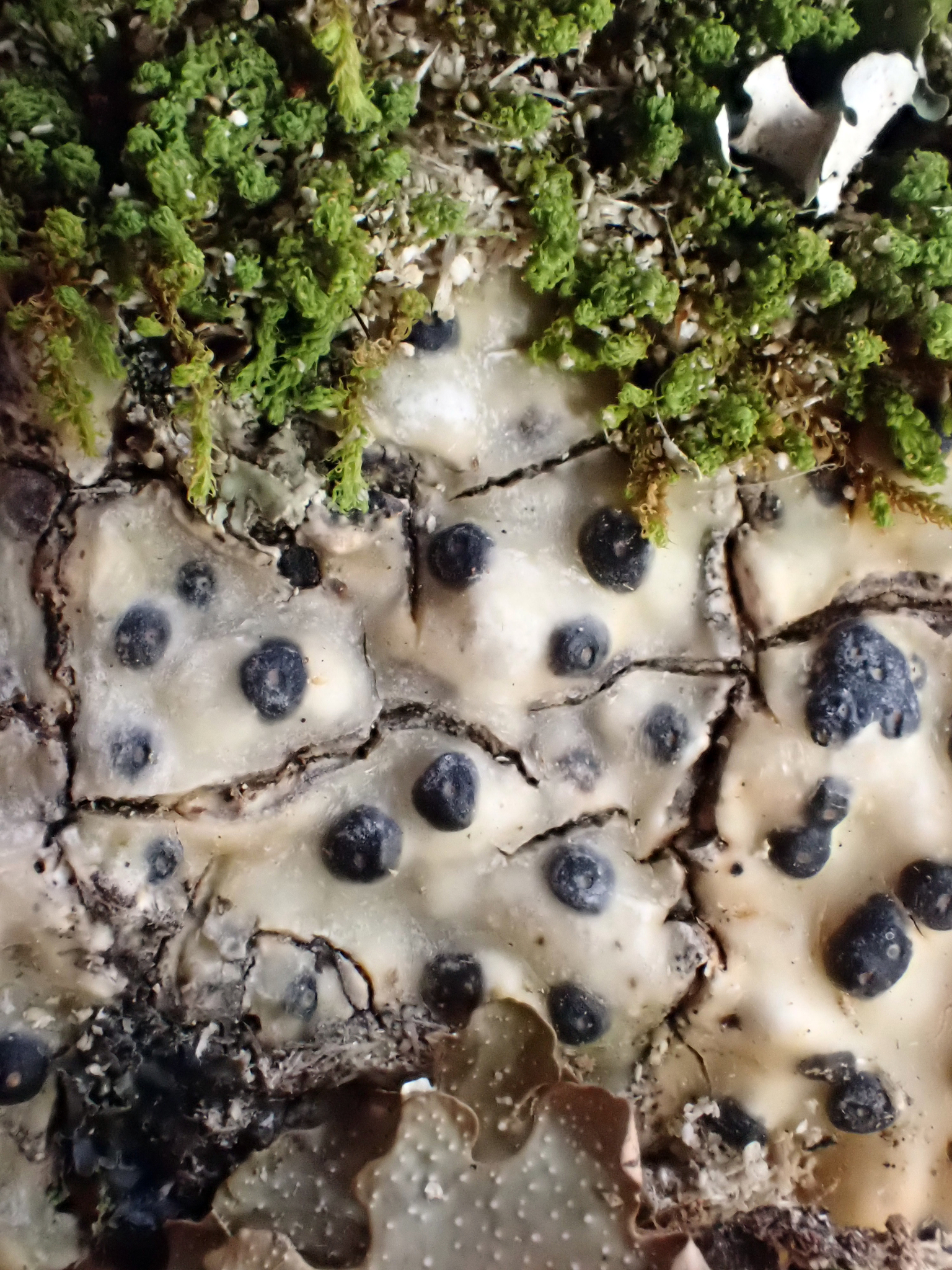
Pyrenula subumbilicata on bark in New Zealand, showing the pale cracked thallus and rounded black fruiting bodies

Pyrenula is a genus of crustose lichens, which form thin, crust-like growths that are usually embedded in the surface of bark, though occasionally they develop more visibly on the surface. The thallus (the main body of the lichen) is generally smooth and continuous, but in some species it may be cracked into small, plate-like sections known as areoles. Small white spots (pseudocyphellae), which assist with gas exchange, may be present in some species. The photobiont—a photosynthetic partner that supplies nutrients—is typically a green alga from the genus Trentepohlia, though it may be absent or reduced in some cases.

The reproductive structures are flask-shaped perithecia, which are usually immersed in the thallus or break through the surface (erumpent). These perithecia are black and range from roughly spherical to somewhat flattened in shape. Each is surrounded by an involucrellum, a layer that spreads out and blends with the exciple (outer wall of the perithecium). This structure consists of fungal filaments mixed with bark fragments and often contains crystalline inclusions. The exciple itself is usually brown and may react with potassium hydroxide solution (KOH) by becoming darker. Colourless calcium oxalate crystals, which dissolve in dilute hydrochloric acid but not in KOH, are frequently present. The opening (ostiole) through which spores are released may be positioned at the top or slightly to the side of the perithecium.

Inside, the spore-producing tissue (hymenium) may include a gel that stains weakly blue or greenish in iodine (I±) and is sometimes filled with tiny oil droplets. Some parts of the hymenium may also contain anthraquinone pigments, which are orange-brown and turn purple-red when treated with potassium hydroxide. The hamathecium, a network of sterile filaments between the asci, initially consists of sparsely septate, branched filaments called pseudoparaphyses. These are gradually replaced by more regular, unbranched paraphyses. Short hair-like structures called periphyses line the ostiole.

The asci are long and cylindrical with a multilayered wall structure. They are stalked and have a thickened apex containing a subapical cap that is visible under a microscope, but they do not stain in iodine (I–, K/I–). Spore release is fissitunicate, meaning the different layers of the ascus wall separate to allow the spores to escape. The ascospores are usually ellipsoidal to spindle-shaped (fusiform), with rounded or pointed ends. They are thick-walled and divided by several septa, forming either three internal partitions (3-septate) or a more complex muriform (brick-like) pattern. All septa are distoseptate (thickened and structurally distinct), and the cell interiors (lumina) may appear lens-shaped or angular. The spores vary in colour from pale to dark brown and lack an outer gelatinous coating (perispore).

Asexual reproduction occurs in black, spherical structures called pycnidia, which may be simple or chambered. These produce long, slender to strongly curved, colourless conidia (asexual spores) that do not have internal divisions (aseptate). Chemical analysis reveals the presence of compounds such as lichexanthone and various unidentified anthraquinones in some species, while others contain no detectable lichen products. Members of Pyrenula typically grow on relatively smooth bark in moist, shaded habitats.

Aptroot emphasized that species of Pyrenula are often distinguished most reliably by microscopic and chemical characters rather than by general appearance alone. Among the more useful features are the presence or absence of pseudocyphellae, the thallus reaction under ultraviolet light, whether the hamathecium is inspersed, and the septation, shape and internal lumina of the ascospores. By contrast, characters such as overall thallus colour, ostiole colour, and slight differences in ascoma shape may vary with age or substrate and are therefore less dependable for identification.

== See also ==
- List of Pyrenula species
