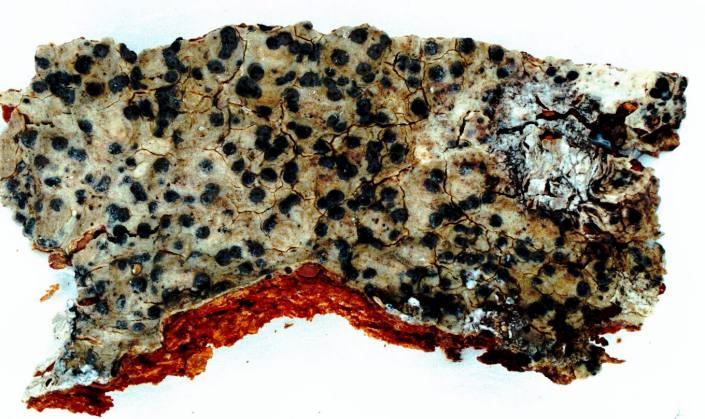
- Herbarium specimen of Pyrenula pseudobufonia, a member of the Pyrenulales.

Scientific classification
- Domain: Eukaryota
- Kingdom: Fungi
- Division: Ascomycota
- Class: Eurotiomycetes
- Subclass: Chaetothyriomycetidae
- Order: Pyrenulales; Fink ex D. Hawksw. & O.E. Erikss. (1986)

Families
- Monoblastiaceae (placement uncertain); Pyrenulaceae; Requienellaceae

= Pyrenulales =

Order of fungi

The Pyrenulales are an order of ascomycetous fungi within the class Eurotiomycetes and within the subphylum Pezizomycotina.

== Taxonomy ==
As of 2022 the order contains one family, 14 genera and around 296 species.

- Order Pyrenulales Fink ex D. Hawksw. & O.E. Erikss.
  - Family Pyrenulaceae Rabenh.
    - Anthracothecium Hampe ex A. Massal. – 5 species
    - Blastodesmia A. Massal. – 1 species
    - Clypeopyrenis Aptroot – 2 species
    - Distopyrenis Aptroot – 8 species
    - Granulopyrenis Aptroot – 6 species
    - Lithothelium Müll. Arg. – 28 species
    - Mazaediothecium Aptroot – 4 species
    - Pyrenographa Aptroot – 1 species
    - Pyrenowilmsia R.C. Harris & Aptroot – 1 species
    - Pyrenula Ach. (=Heufleridium Müll. Arg.; =Stromatothelium Trevis.) – circa 225 species
    - Pyrgillus Nyl. – 8 species
    - Sulcopyrenula H. Harada – 5 species
  - Pyrenulales incertae sedis
    - Rhaphidicyrtis Vain. – 1 species
    - Xenus Kohlm. & Volkm.-Kohlm. – 1 species
