= List of Pyrenula species =

The genus Pyrenula consists of crustose lichens that usually grow on smooth, shaded bark. About 750 taxa have been named in the genus, although the majority of these names have been excluded from the genus as they have been transferred to other genera, or are considered synonyms. In his world key to the Pyrenula species, published in 2012, André Aptroot accepted 169 species, including 7 not yet formally described. As of November 2025, Species Fungorum (in the Catalogue of Life) accepts 269 species of Pyrenula.

== A ==
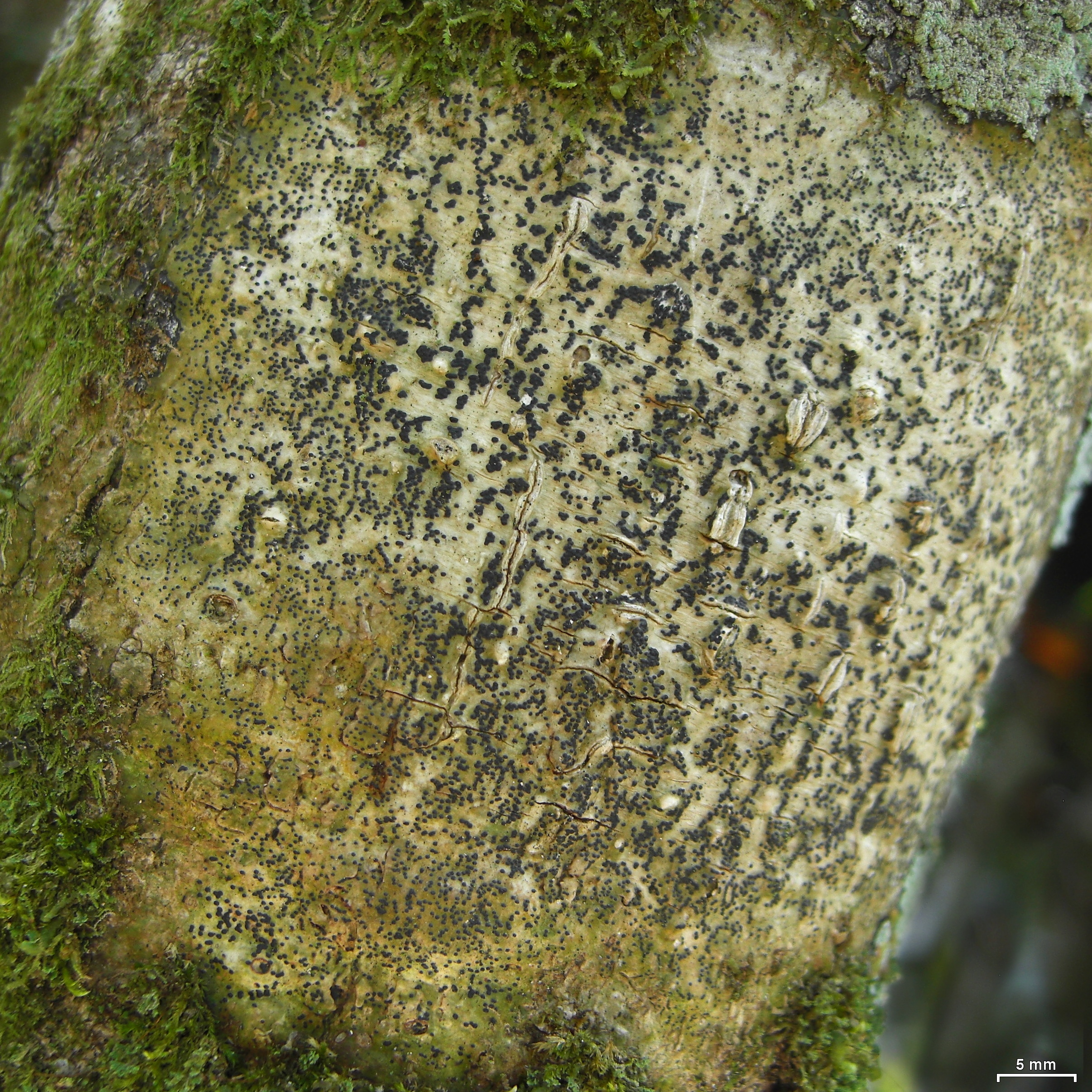
Pyrenula aspistea

- Pyrenula abditicarpa Aptroot & M.Cáceres (2014) – Brazil
- Pyrenula acutispora Kalb & Hafellner (1992)
- Pyrenula adacta Fée (1825)
- Pyrenula aggregataspistea Aptroot & M.Cáceres (2013) – South America
- Pyrenula albonigra Aptroot, D.S.Andrade & M.Cáceres (2014) – Brazil
- Pyrenula andina Aptroot (2008)
- Pyrenula annulata Müll.Arg. (1893)
- Pyrenula anomala (Ach.) Vain. (1915)
- Pyrenula arthoniotheca Upreti (1998) – India
- Pyrenula asahinae (Kashiw. & Kurok.) H.Harada (2004) – Japan
- Pyrenula aspistea (Afzel. ex Ach.) Ach. (1814)
- Pyrenula astroidea (Fée) R.C.Harris (1989)
- Pyrenula asymmetrica Lücking, N.Marín & B.Moncada (2023) – Colombia
- Pyrenula aurantiacorubra Aptroot & M.Cáceres (2014) – Brazil
- Pyrenula aurantioinspersa Aptroot & Sipman (2013) – South America
- Pyrenula aurantiopileata Aptroot (2007) – Thailand
- Pyrenula aurantiothallina C.O.Mendonça, Aptroot & M.Cáceres (2016) – Brazil

== B ==
- Pyrenula baileyi (C.Knight) Shirley (1889)
- Pyrenula bataanensis (Rehm) Shoemaker & P.M.LeClair (1975)
- Pyrenula bicuspidata Müll.Arg. (1893)
- Pyrenula biseptata Aptroot & M.Cáceres (2018)
- Pyrenula bispora Aptroot & M.Cáceres (2013) – Brazil
- Pyrenula borneensis Aptroot (2012) – Borneo
- Pyrenula breutelii (Müll.Arg.) Aptroot (2011)

== C ==
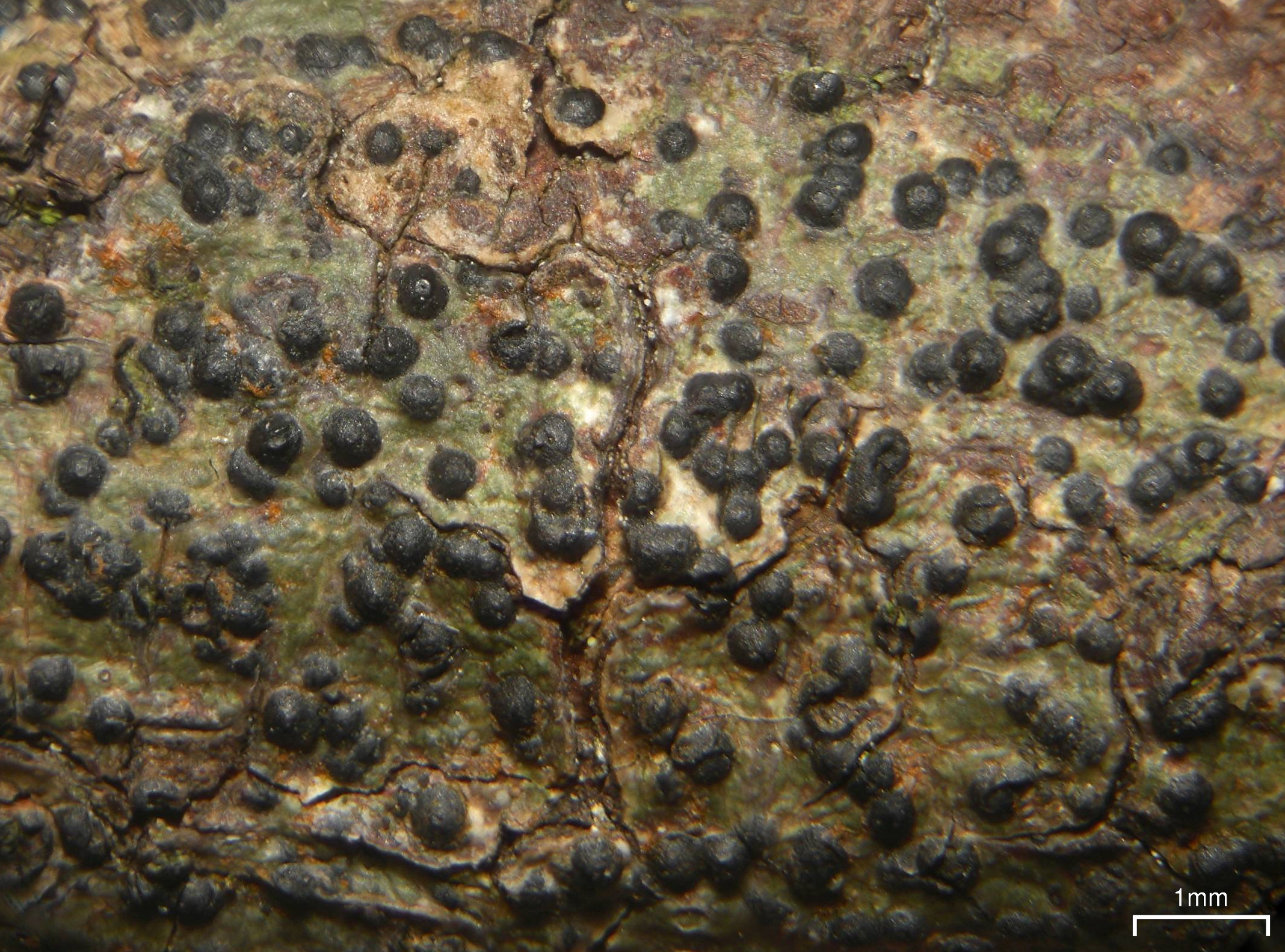
Pyrenula citriformis

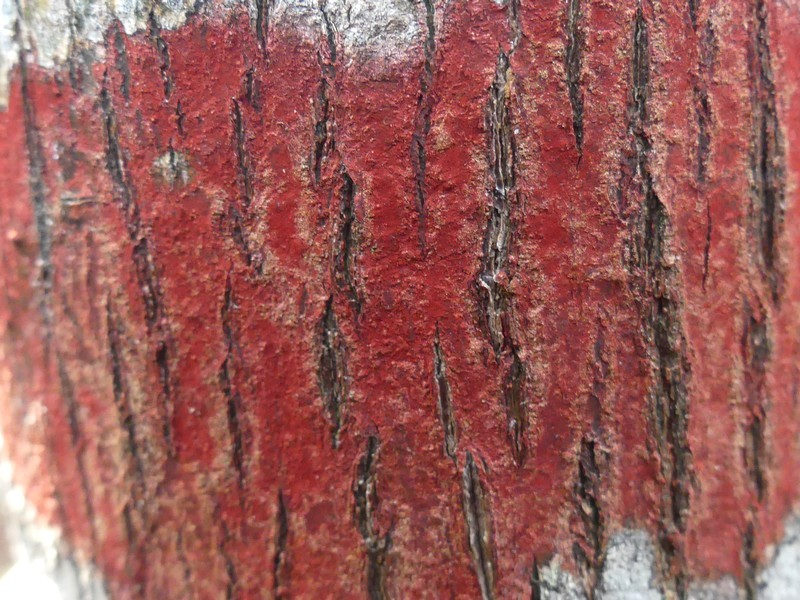
Pyrenula cruenta

- Pyrenula caraibica Aptroot & Etayo (2003) – Panama
- Pyrenula celaticarpa Aptroot & M.Cáceres (2014) – Brazil
- Pyrenula cerina Eschw. (1824)
- Pyrenula ceylonensis (Ajay Singh & Upreti) Aptroot (2011)
- Pyrenula chloroplaca Shirley (1894) – Australia
- Pyrenula chlorospila Arnold (1887)
- Pyrenula ciliata Aptroot (1997)
- Pyrenula cinnabarina Aptroot, E.L.Lima & M.Cáceres (2014) – Brazil
- Pyrenula clavatispora Common & Aptroot (2017) – Florida
- Pyrenula coccinea C.O.Mendonça, Aptroot & M.Cáceres (2016) – Brazil
- Pyrenula concatervans (Nyl.) R.C.Harris (1980)
- Pyrenula confinis (Nyl.) R.C.Harris (1995)
- Pyrenula conspurcata Müll.Arg. (1895)
- Pyrenula convexa (Nyl.) Müll.Arg. (1882)
- Pyrenula cornutispora Aptroot & M.Cáceres (2013) – South America
- Pyrenula corticata (Müll.Arg.) R.C.Harris (1989)
- Pyrenula coryli A.Massal. (1852)
- Pyrenula crassiuscula (Malme) Aptroot (2002) – Brazil
- Pyrenula cruenta (Mont.) Vain. (1890)
- Pyrenula cruentata (Müll.Arg.) R.C.Harris (1987)
- Pyrenula cryptothelia (Müll.Arg.) Aptroot & Etayo (2003) – Panama
- Pyrenula cubica Sipman (2023) – Guyana

== D ==
- Pyrenula dalmatioides A.J. Marshall, Blanchon, de Lange & Aptroot (2025) – New Zealand
- Pyrenula darjeelingensis Jagad.Ram & G.P.Sinha (2010) – India
- Pyrenula decumbens (Müll.Arg.) Upreti (1998)
- Pyrenula defossa Müll.Arg. (1882)
- Pyrenula dermatodes (Borrer) Schaer. (1850)
- Pyrenula diamantinensis C.O.Mendonça, Aptroot & M.Cáceres (2016) – Brazil
- Pyrenula duplicans (Nyl.) Aptroot (2008)

== E ==
- Pyrenula endocrocea Aptroot (2012) – Philippines
- Pyrenula endoperidermica B.Moncada & Lücking (2025) – Costa Rica

== F ==
- Pyrenula ferruginea B.Moncada & Lücking (2025) – Costa Rica
- Pyrenula fibrata (Stirt. ex F.M. Bailey) Zahlbr. (1922)
- Pyrenula filiformis Aptroot (2014) – New Caledonia
- Pyrenula finitima Müll.Arg. (1887)
- Pyrenula flavascolea B.Moncada & Lücking (2025) – Ecuador
- Pyrenula flavicans (Nyl.) B.Moncada & Lücking (2025) – Colombia
- Pyrenula flavida Sipman (2023) – Guyana
- Pyrenula flavoinspersa Aptroot & Sipman (2013) – South America
- Pyrenula fuscoluminata Aptroot (2002)
- Pyrenula fusispora (Malme) Aptroot (2011)
- Pyrenula fusoluminata Aptroot (2002) – Brazil

== G ==
- Pyrenula galactina (Shirley) Kantvilas (1988)
- Pyrenula gahavisukana Aptroot (1997)
- Pyrenula gibberulosa (Vain.) Aptroot (2011)
- Pyrenula globifera (Eschw.) Aptroot (2008)
- Pyrenula grossa Aptroot (1997)
- Pyrenula guyanensis Sipman & Aptroot (2013) – South America

== H ==
- Pyrenula hawaiiensis Aptroot (2012) – Hawaii
- Pyrenula henrici B.Moncada & Lücking (2025) – Papua New Guinea
- Pyrenula hibernica (Nyl.) Aptroot & Etayo (2003) – Panama
- Pyrenula howeana Aptroot (2007) – Australia

== I ==
- Pyrenula immersa Müll.Arg. (1887)
- Pyrenula indusiata Müll.Arg. (1895)
- Pyrenula infracongruens Aptroot & Schumm (2010)
- Pyrenula infraleucotrypa Aptroot & M.Cáceres (2013) – South America
- Pyrenula inframamillana Aptroot & M.Cáceres (2013) – South America
- Pyrenula infrastroidea Aptroot & Sipman (2013) – South America
- Pyrenula inspersicollaris Aptroot & M.Cáceres (2014) – Brazil
- Pyrenula inspersoleucotrypa Aptroot, L.I.Ferraro & M.Cáceres (2014) – Argentina
- Pyrenula inversa B.Moncada & Lücking (2025) – Colombia

== L ==
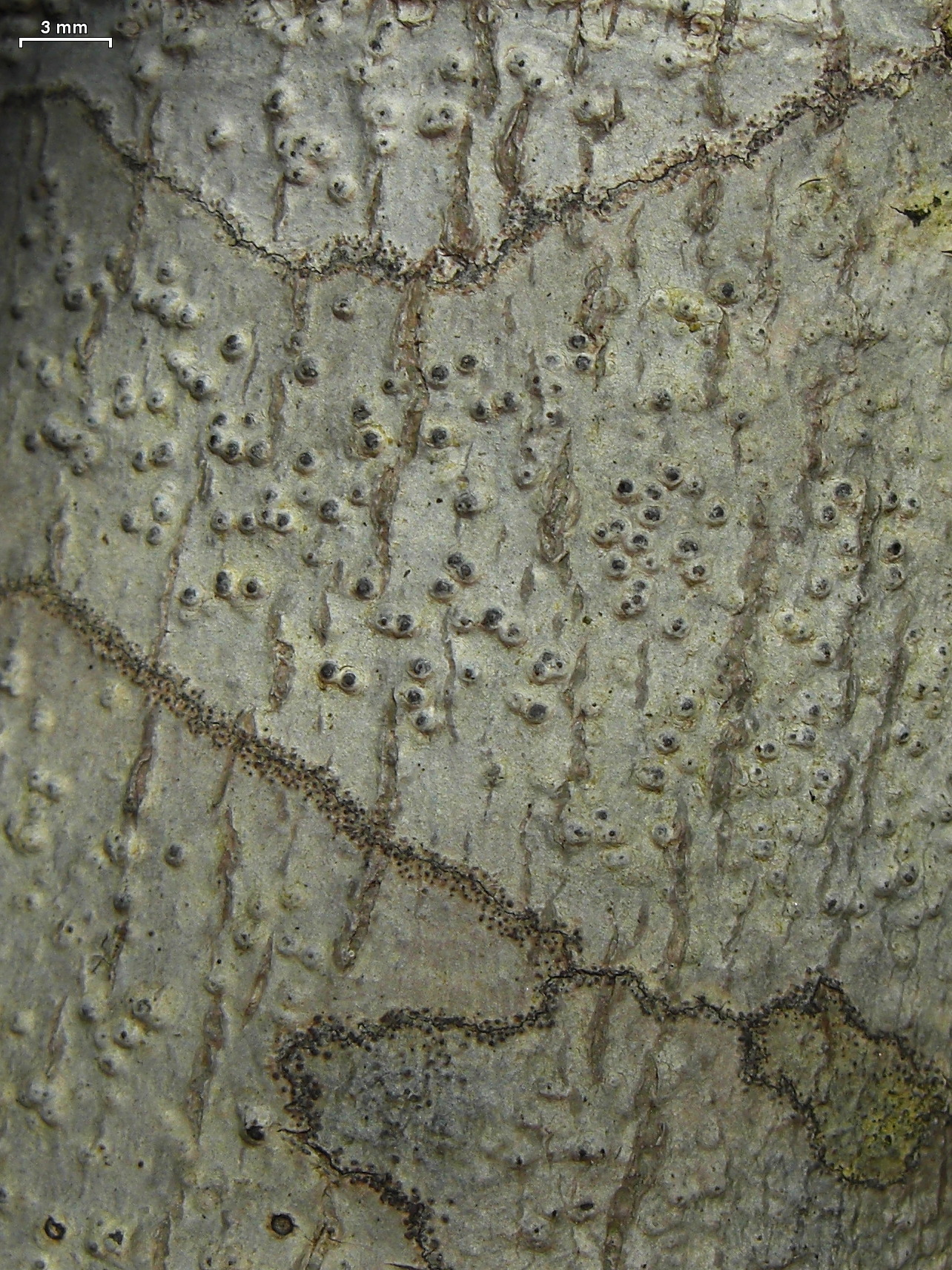
Pyrenula leucostoma

- Pyrenula laevigata (Pers.) Arnold (1885)
- Pyrenula laii Aptroot (2003) – Taiwan
- Pyrenula latens B.Moncada & Lücking (2025) – Costa Rica
- Pyrenula leptaleoides Aptroot & M.Cáceres (2013) – Brazil
- Pyrenula largei A.J. Marshall, de Lange, Blanchon & Aptroot (2025) – New Zealand
- Pyrenula leucostoma Ach. (1814)
- Pyrenula lilacina C.O.Mendonça, Aptroot & M.Cáceres (2016) – Brazil
- Pyrenula lineatostroma Aptroot (1997)
- Pyrenula luteopruinosa Etayo & Aptroot (2003) – Panama
- Pyrenula lyonii (Zahlbr.) Aptroot (2011)

== M ==
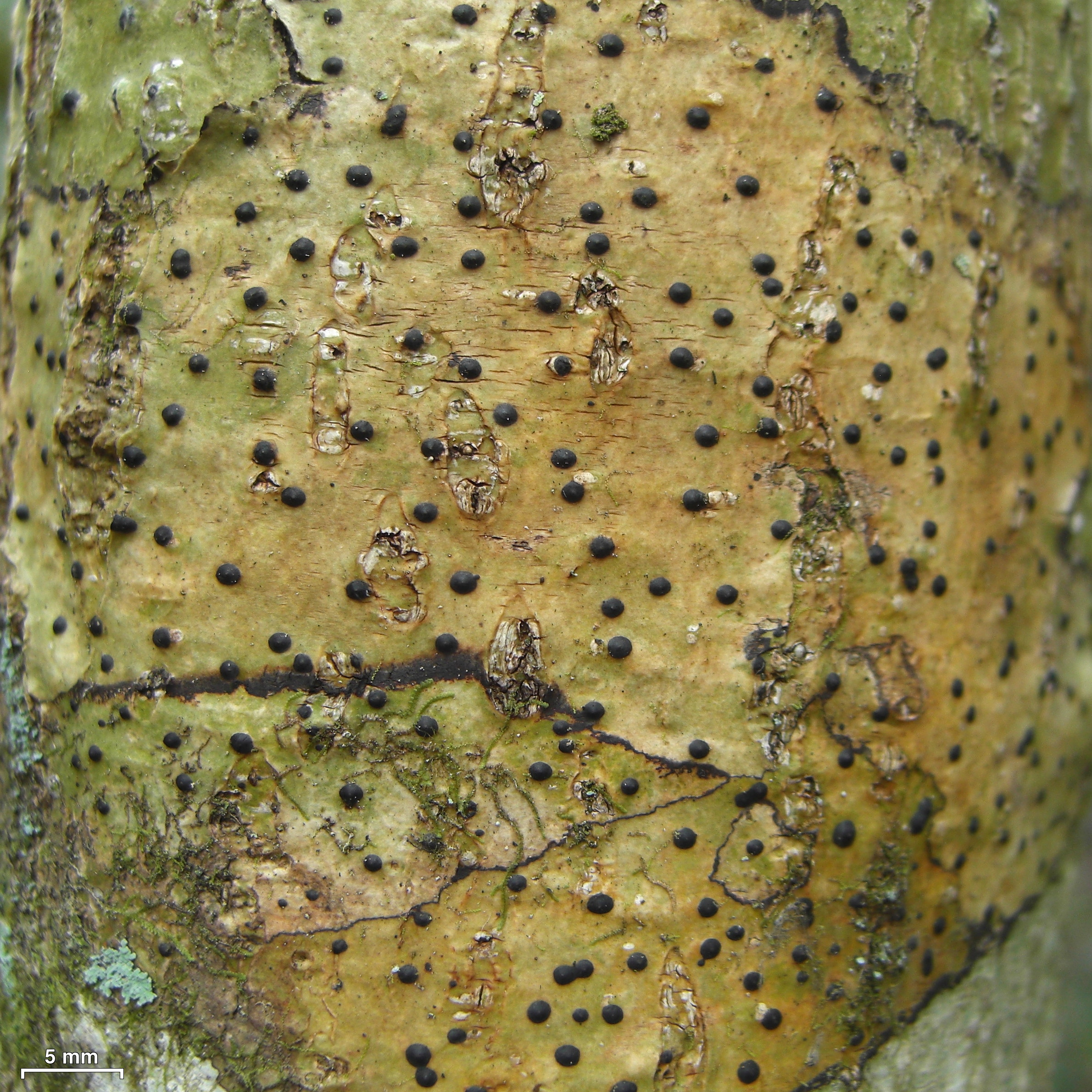
Pyrenula mamillana

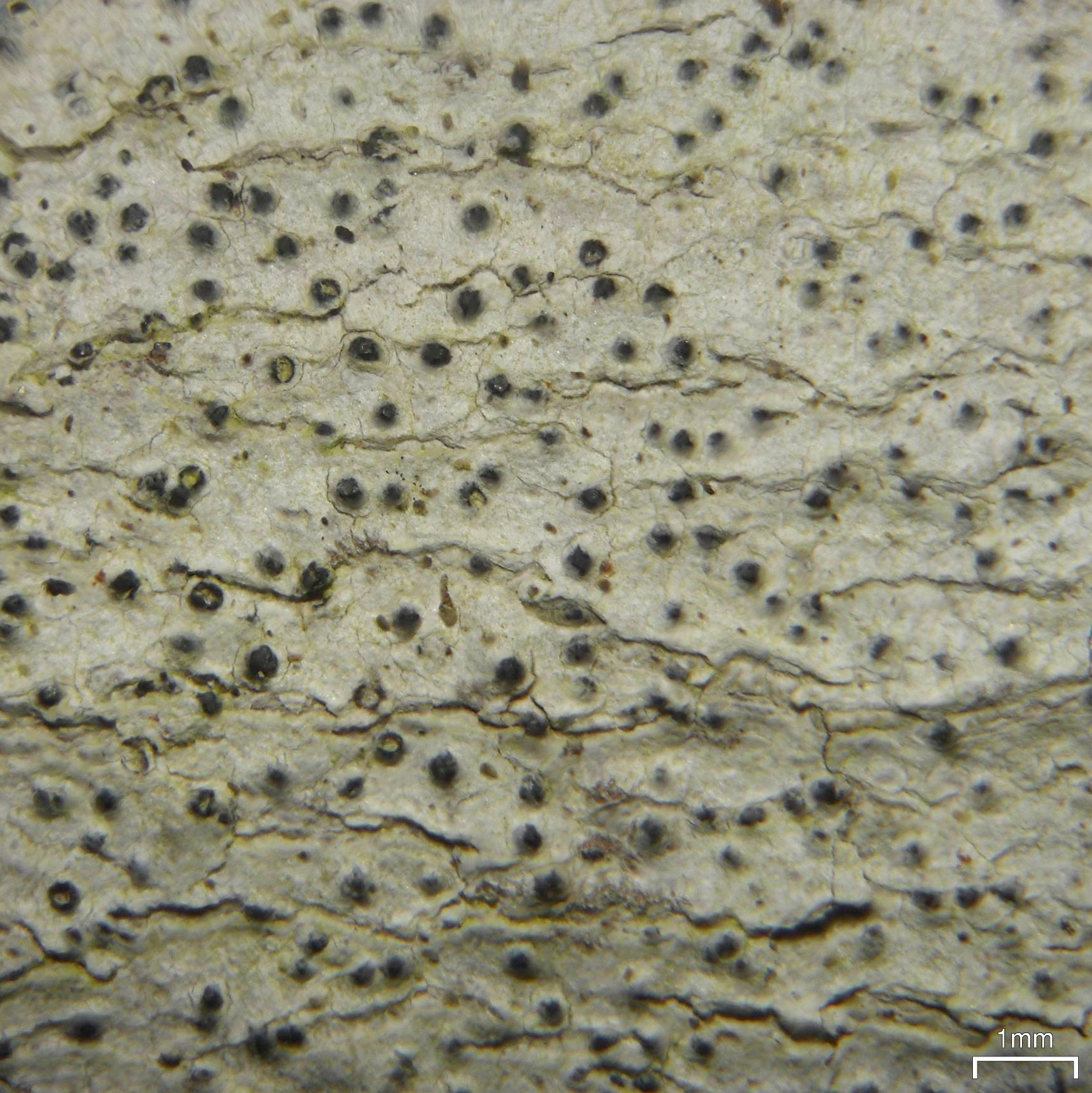
Pyrenula microcarpa

- Pyrenula macrospora (Degel.) Coppins & P.James (1980)
- Pyrenula macularis (Zahlbr.) R.C.Harris (1989)
- Pyrenula mamillana (Ach.) Trevis. (1860)
- Pyrenula maritima Sipman & Aptroot (2013) – South America
- Pyrenula mastigophora Aptroot (2014) – South Solomons
- Pyrenula mastophora (Nyl.) Müll.Arg. (1883)
- Pyrenula mastophorizans Müll.Arg. (1885)
- Pyrenula mattickiana Sipman & Aptroot (2013) – South America
- Pyrenula media Aptroot (1997)
- Pyrenula melaleuca Müll.Arg. (1891)
- Pyrenula microcarpa Müll.Arg. (1885)
- Pyrenula microcarpoides Müll.Arg. (1895)
- Pyrenula micromma (Mont.) Trevis. (1853)
- Pyrenula microtheca R.C.Harris (1989)
- Pyrenula minae Aptroot & Lücking (2008)
- Pyrenula minoides Aptroot & Sipman (2013) – South America
- Pyrenula minutispora Aptroot & M.Cáceres (2015) – Brazil
- Pyrenula minutissima Aptroot, Valadb. & Sipman (2012) – Iran
- Pyrenula monospora Aptroot & Sipman (2013) – South America
- Pyrenula montana Aptroot (1997)
- Pyrenula montocensis Lücking (2008)
- Pyrenula multicolorata Weerakoon & Aptroot (2016) – Sri Lanka
- Pyrenula muriciliata Diederich & Ertz (2020) – Mauritius
- Pyrenula musaespora Aptroot & M.Cáceres (2014) – Brazil

== N ==
- Pyrenula neojaponica H.Harada (2004) – Japan
- Pyrenula neolaevigata H.Harada (2004) – Japan
- Pyrenula neosandwicensis Aptroot (2011)
- Pyrenula nigrocincta Müll.Arg. (1891)
- Pyrenula nitida (Weigel) Ach. (1814)
- Pyrenula nitidans Müll.Arg. (1891)
- Pyrenula nitidella (Flörke ex Schaer.) Müll.Arg. (1885)
- Pyrenula nitidula (Bres.) R.C.Harris (1997)

== O ==
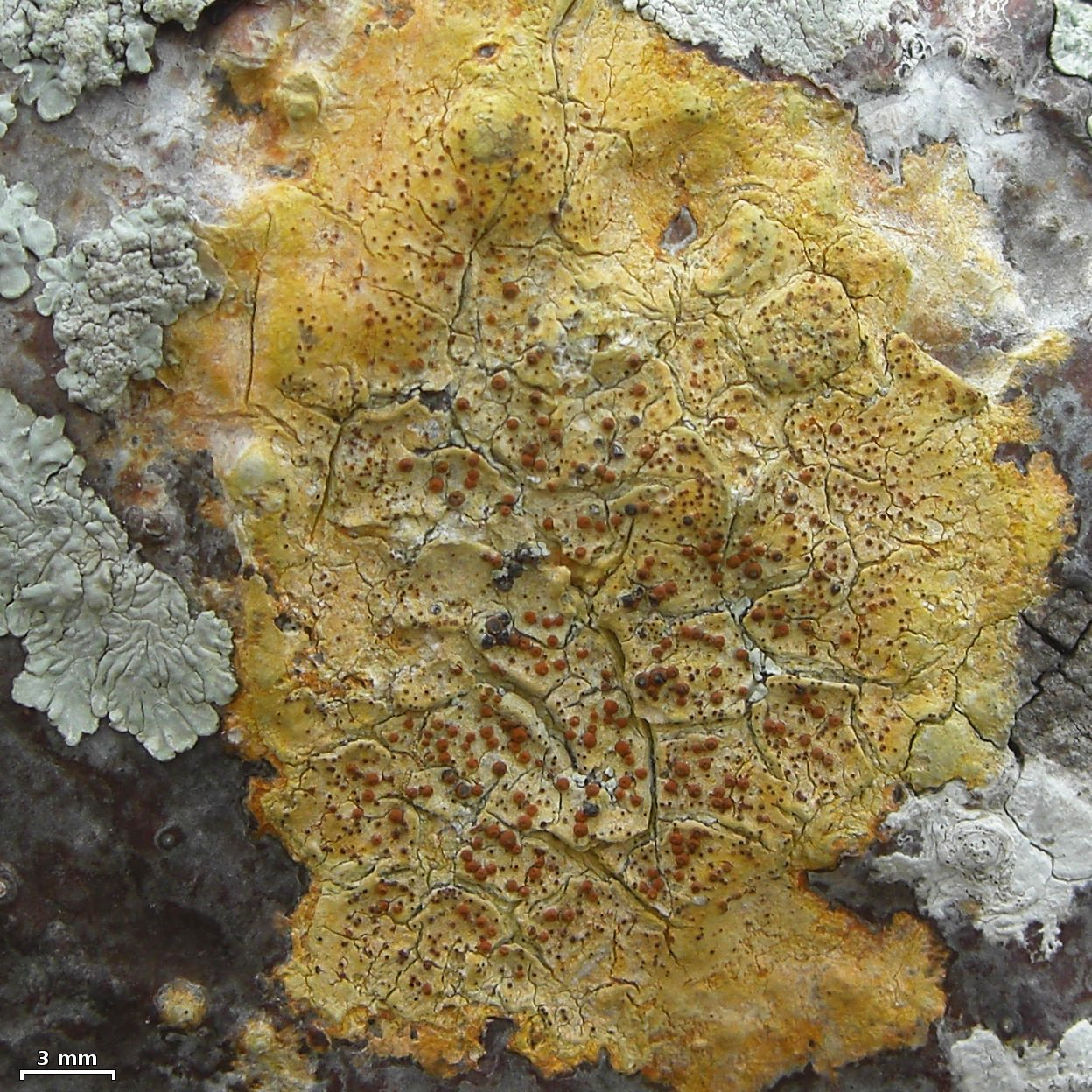
Pyrenula ochraceoflava

- Pyrenula occidentalis (R.C.Harris) R.C.Harris (1987)
- Pyrenula occulta (C.Knight) Müll.Arg. (1894)
- Pyrenula ocellulata Wijey., Lücking & Lumbsch (2012) – Sri Lanka
- Pyrenula ochraceoflava (Nyl.) R.C.Harris (1989)
- Pyrenula oxysporiza Zahlbr. (1922)

== P ==
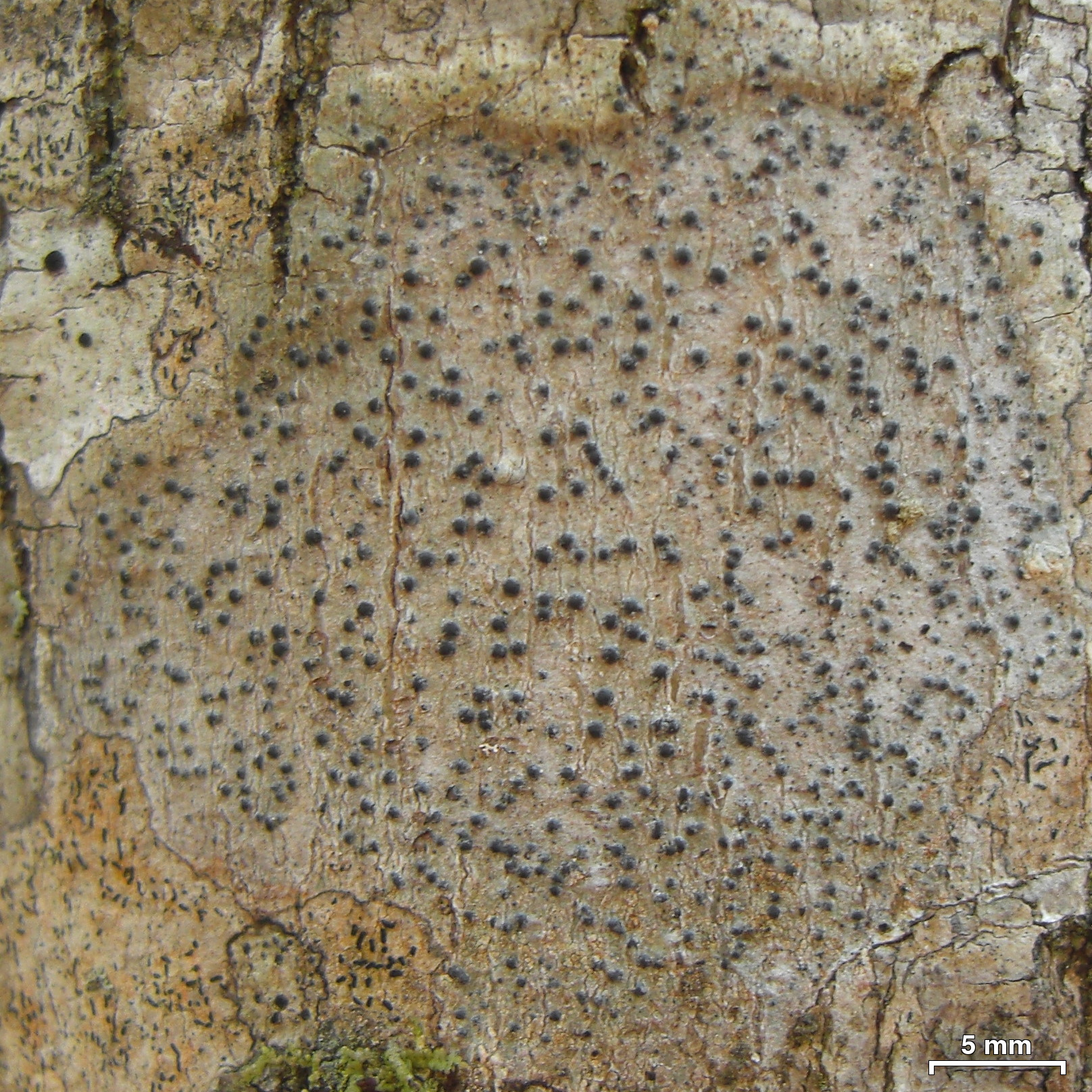
Pyrenula pseudobufonia

- Pyrenula papillifera (Nyl.) Aptroot (2011)
- Pyrenula paraminarum Aptroot & M.Cáceres (2013) – South America
- Pyrenula parvinuclea (Meyen & Flot.) Aptroot (1997)
- Pyrenula perfecta Aptroot & Sipman (2013) – South America
- Pyrenula pinguis Fée (1825)
- Pyrenula platystoma (Müll.Arg.) Aptroot (2011)
- Pyrenula plicata Sipman & Aptroot (2013) – South America
- Pyrenula porinoides Ach. (1814)
- Pyrenula prostrata (Stirt.) D.J.Galloway (2004) – New Zealand
- Pyrenula pseudobufonia (Rehm) R.C.Harris (1985)
- Pyrenula punctoleucotrypa Aptroot, L.I.Ferraro & M.Cáceres (2014) – Argentina
- Pyrenula pyrenastroides (C.Knight) D.J.Galloway (2004) – New Zealand
- Pyrenula pyrenastrospora Aptroot (1997)
- Pyrenula pyrenuloides (Mont.) R.C.Harris (1989)
- Pyrenula pyrgillospora Aptroot (1997)

== Q ==
- Pyrenula quadratolocularis A.J Marshall, de Lange, Blanchon & Aptroot (2025) – New Zealand
- Pyrenula quartzitica Aptroot (2002) – Brazil
- Pyrenula quassiicola Fée (1837)

== R ==
- Pyrenula ravenelii (Tuck.) R.C.Harris (1989)
- Pyrenula reebiae Aptroot & Gueidan (2015) – North America
- Pyrenula reginae E.L.Lima, Aptroot & M.Cáceres (2013) – Brazil
- Pyrenula relicta Etayo & Puntillo (2011)
- Pyrenula rhomboidea Aptroot & M.Cáceres (2013) – Brazil
- Pyrenula rinodinospora Aptroot (2012) – Papua New Guinea
- Pyrenula rubroanomala Aptroot & Lücking (2008)
- Pyrenula rubroinspersa Aptroot & Sipman (2013) – South America
- Pyrenula rubrojavanica Aptroot (2012) – Java
- Pyrenula rubrolateralis Aptroot & M.Cáceres (2014) – Brazil
- Pyrenula rubromamillana E.L.Lima, Aptroot & M.Cáceres (2013) – Brazil
- Pyrenula rubromarginata Sipman (2023) – Guyana
- Pyrenula rubronitidula Aptroot & M.Cáceres (2013) – South America
- Pyrenula rubrostigma Aptroot & M.Cáceres (2013) – South America
- Pyrenula rubrostoma R.C.Harris (1980)
- Pyrenula rufotetraspora M.Z.Dou & Z.F.Jia (2024) – China

== S ==
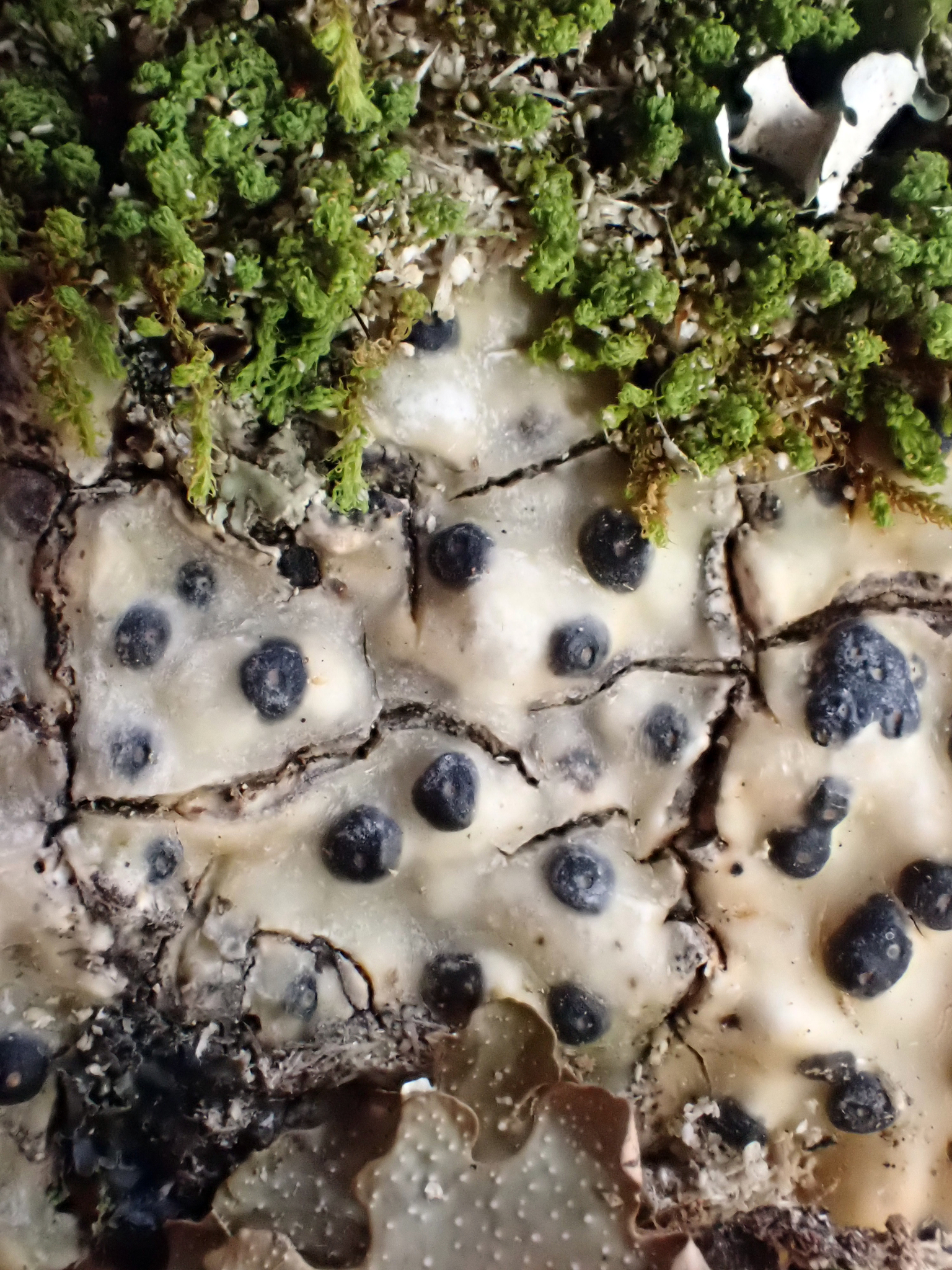
Pyrenula subumbilicata

- Pyrenula salmonea Aptroot (2021) – Brazil
- Pyrenula sanguinea Aptroot, M.Cáceres & Lücking (2013) – Brazil
- Pyrenula sanguineoastroidea Aptroot (2021) – Brazil
- Pyrenula sanguineomeandrata Aptroot & Mercado Diaz (2018)
- Pyrenula sanguineostiolata Aptroot & Mercado Diaz (2018)
- Pyrenula santensis (Nyl.) Müll.Arg. (1882)
- Pyrenula schiffneri (Zahlbr.) Aptroot (2011)
- Pyrenula segregata (Nyl.) Müll.Arg. (1887)
- Pyrenula seminuda (Müll.Arg.) Sipman & Aptroot (2013) – South America
- Pyrenula sexlocularis (Nyl.) Müll.Arg. (1877)
- Pyrenula sexluminata Aptroot (2011)
- Pyrenula shirleyana (Müll.Arg.) Aptroot (2007) – Australia
- Pyrenula sipmanii Aptroot & K.H.Moon (2009) – South Korea
- Pyrenula solomonii A.J. Marshall, de Lange, Blanchon & Aptroot (2025) – New Zealand
- Pyrenula spissitunicata Aptroot (2014) – South Solomons
- Pyrenula subcongruens Müll.Arg. (1895)
- Pyrenula subcylindrica Jagad.Ram & Upreti (2005) – India
- Pyrenula submacularis M.Z.Dou & Z.F.Jia (2024) – China
- Pyrenula submicromma Sipman (2023) – French Guiana
- Pyrenula subsoluta (Müll.Arg.) Aptroot (2008)
- Pyrenula subumbilicata (C.Knight) Aptroot (2007) – Australia
- Pyrenula subvariolosa (C.Knight) Aptroot (2007) – Australia
- Pyrenula supracongruens Aptroot & Schumm (2010)
- Pyrenula supralaetior C.O.Mendonça, Aptroot & M.Cáceres (2016) – Brazil

== T ==
- Pyrenula tetraspora Aptroot & Sipman (2013) – South America
- Pyrenula thailandica Aptroot (2012) – Papua New Guinea; India; Thailand
- Pyrenula tica B.Moncada & Lücking (2025) – Bolivia; Costa Rica
- Pyrenula tokyoensis (Müll.Arg.) H.Harada (2004) – Japan
- Pyrenula triangularis Aptroot & Sipman (2013) – South America

== V ==
- Pyrenula velatior Müll.Arg. (1885)
- Pyrenula vermicularis (Kashiw. & Kurok.) H.Harada (2004) – Japan
- Pyrenula violaceastroidea C.O.Mendonça, Aptroot & M.Cáceres (2016) – Brazil
- Pyrenula viridipyrgilla Aptroot & M.Cáceres (2013) – South America

== W ==
- Pyrenula warmingii (Kremp.) Müll.Arg. (1884)
- Pyrenula welwitschii (Upreti & Ajay Singh) Aptroot (2011)

== Y ==
- Pyrenula yunguiensis M.Z.Dou & Z.F.Jia (2024) – China

== X ==
- Pyrenula xanthinspersa Aptroot & M.Cáceres (2018)
- Pyrenula xanthoglobulifera Aptroot, Lücking & M.Cáceres (2013) – Brazil
- Pyrenula xanthomaculata B.Moncada & Lücking (2025) – Costa Rica; Colombia
- Pyrenula xanthominuta Aptroot (2007) – Australia

== Former Pyrenula species ==
Many taxa once placed in Pyrenula have been moved to other genera or have been synonymized; these former Pyrenula species are listed here. (Note: Source: Species Fungorum (names listed in blue are not currently accepted).)

- Pyrenula achariana (Fée) Vain. (1901) = Melanotheca achariana
- Pyrenula achroopora (Nyl.) Arnold (1871) = Pyrenula dermatodes
- Pyrenula addubitans (Stirt.) Zahlbr. (1922) = Pleospora addubitans
- Pyrenula aenea (Körb.) Rabenh. (1870) = Pseudosagedia aenea
- Pyrenula aethiobola (Wahlenb.) Ach. (1814) = Verrucaria aethiobola
- Pyrenula albissima (Ach.) Trevis. (1853) = Leptorhaphis epidermidis
- Pyrenula americana (A.Massal.) Trevis. (1853) = Anisomeridium americanum
- Pyrenula analepta (Ach.) Trevis. (1853) = Arthopyrenia analepta
- Pyrenula annularis Fée (1825) = Astrothelium annulare
- Pyrenula aractina (Wahlenb.) Ach. (1814) = Hydropunctaria aractina
- Pyrenula areolata Ach. (1814) = Staurothele areolata
- Pyrenula arthonioides (Eschw.) Vain. (1901) = Pyrenula arthoniotheca
- Pyrenula biformis Hepp (1853) = Microthelia biformis
- Pyrenula canellae-albae Fée (1837) = Sulcopyrenula canellae-albae
- Pyrenula carpinea (Pers.) Trevis. (1853) = Segestria carpinea
- Pyrenula cartilaginea Fée (1825) = Astrothelium cartilagineum
- Pyrenula catalepta (Ach.) Ach. (1814) = Verrucaria aethiobola
- Pyrenula catervaria (Fée) A.Massal. (1855) = Trypethelium variolosum
- Pyrenula cerasi (Schrad.) Trevis. (1853) = Arthopyrenia cerasi
- Pyrenula ceratina Fée (1837) = Astrothelium ceratinum
- Pyrenula chilensis (Fée) R.C.Harris (1989) = Parmentaria chilensis
- Pyrenula chlorotica (Ach.) Trevis. (1853) = Pseudosagedia chlorotica
- Pyrenula cinchonae (Ach.) Tuck. (1868) = Constrictolumina cinchonae
- Pyrenula circumrubens (Nyl.) B. de Lesd. (1910) = Pyrenula cruenta
- Pyrenula clandestina Ach. (1814) = Clandestinotrema clandestinum
- Pyrenula clopima (Wahlenb.) Ach. (1814) = Staurothele clopima
- Pyrenula coactella (Stirt.) Upreti (1998) = Melanothecopsis coactella
- Pyrenula collospora Vain. (1918) = Bogoriella collospora
- Pyrenula diluta (Fée) Tuck. (1868) = Pseudopyrenula diluta
- Pyrenula discissa (Nyl.) Zahlbr. (1922) = Phaeotrema discissum
- Pyrenula discolor Ach. (1814) = Ampliotrema discolor
- Pyrenula elaeina (Borrer) Schaer. (1850) = Verrucaria elaeina
- Pyrenula emergens (Müll.Arg.) Vain. (1930) = Pyrenula pinguis
- Pyrenula endococcoidea (Nyl.) Willey (1892) = Phaeospora rimosicola
- Pyrenula epidermidis (Ach.) Trevis. (1853) = Leptorhaphis epidermidis
- Pyrenula fallaciosa (Stizenb. ex Arnold) Willey (1892) = Arthopyrenia fallaciosa
- Pyrenula flaventior (Stirt.) Müll.Arg. (1887) = Pyrenula mastophora
- Pyrenula fraxini (A.Massal.) Trevis. (1853) = Naetrocymbe fraxini
- Pyrenula fuliginea Ach. (1814) = Thelignya lignyota
- Pyrenula funckii Spreng. (1826) = Verrucaria funckii
- Pyrenula fusca (Kremp.) Vain. (1915) = Pyrenula anomala
- Pyrenula gaudichaudii (Fée) Pers. (1827) = Nigrovothelium tropicum
- Pyrenula gelatinosa (Ach.) Schaer. (1850) = Agonimia gelatinosa
- Pyrenula gemmata (Ach.) Nägeli (1853) = Acrocordia gemmata
- Pyrenula gemmifera (Taylor) Willey (1887) = Tichothecium gemmiferum
- Pyrenula gibbosa Ach. (1810) = Rimularia gibbosa
- Pyrenula glabra (A.Massal.) Trevis. (1853) = Swinscowia glabra
- Pyrenula glabratula (Nyl.) Arnold (1871) = Pyrenula dermatodes
- Pyrenula guayaci (Fée) Müll.Arg. (1888) = Parapyrenis guayaci
- Pyrenula harrisii Hafellner & Kalb (1992) = Pyrenula occidentalis
- Pyrenula henatomma (Ach.) Ach. (1810) = Ocellularia henatomma
- Pyrenula hyalospora (Nyl.) Tuck. (1872) = Lithothelium hyalosporum
- Pyrenula hydrela (Ach.) Schaer. (1850) = Verrucaria hydrela
- Pyrenula infernalis (Mont.) Trevis. (1853) = Megalotremis infernalis
- Pyrenula interjungens (Nyl.) Lange (1872) = Pseudosagedia interjungens
- Pyrenula kakouettae Sérus. (1992) = Pyrenula acutispora
- Pyrenula kunthii (Fée) Fée (1837) = Pyrenula mamillana
- Pyrenula leucocephala (Ach.) Ach. (1814) = Lecanactis abietina
- Pyrenula leucoplaca (Wallr.) Körb. (1855) = Eopyrenula leucoplaca
- Pyrenula libricola Fée (1837) = Pyrenula leucostoma
- Pyrenula lignyota (Wahlenb.) Ach. (1814) = Thelignya lignyota
- Pyrenula lithina (Ach.) Ach. (1814) = Staurothele fissa
- Pyrenula marcida Fée (1825) = Astrothelium marcidum
- Pyrenula margacea (Wahlenb.) Ach. (1809) = Verrucaria margacea
- Pyrenula marginata Hook. (1822) = Pyrenula mamillana
- Pyrenula martinicana (Vain.) R.C.Harris (1989) = Pyrenula caraibica
- Pyrenula mastoidea Ach. (1814) = Clathroporina mastoidea
- Pyrenula megalospora Fink (1899) = Acrocordia megalospora
- Pyrenula melanospora Hepp (1860) = Mycomicrothelia melanospora
- Pyrenula micromma Shirley (1890) = Pyrenula occulta
- Pyrenula microscopica Müll.Arg. (1867) = Mycoporopsis microscopica
- Pyrenula microthelia (Wallr.) Schaer. (1850) = Roselliniella microthelia
- Pyrenula neoculata Aptroot (2007) = Anthracothecium oculatum
- Pyrenula nigrescens (Pers.) Ach. (1814) = Verrucaria nigrescens
- Pyrenula nitens (Fée) Fée (1837) = Architrypethelium nitens
- Pyrenula nitidella f. chlorospila (Arnold) Szatala (1940) = Pyrenula chlorospila
- Pyrenula obovata (Stirt.) Shirley (1890) = Bogoriella obovata
- Pyrenula ocellata (Müll.Arg.) Zahlbr. (1922) = Polymeridium ocellatum
- Pyrenula ochraceoflavens (Nyl.) R.C.Harris (1989) = Pyrenula ochraceoflava
- Pyrenula olivacea Schaer. (1850) = Pseudosagedia borreri
- Pyrenula olivacea (Pers.) Hepp (1857) = Arthopyrenia analepta
- Pyrenula oxyspora (Nyl.) Hepp (1857) = Leptorhaphis epidermidis
- Pyrenula oxyspora Müll.Arg. (1895) = Pyrenula oxysporiza
- Pyrenula papularis (Fr.) Schaer. (1850) = Thelidium papulare
- Pyrenula perpusilla (Nyl.) Willey (1887) = Endococcus rugulosus
- Pyrenula pertusarioidea Kremp. (1881) = Polyblastiopsis pertusarioidea
- Pyrenula planorbis (Ach.) Trevis. (1853) = Constrictolumina planorbis
- Pyrenula punctiformis (Pers.) Trevis. (1853) = Naetrocymbe punctiformis
- Pyrenula pupula Ach. (1814) = Astrothelium pupula
- Pyrenula pygmaea (Körb.) Tuck. (1872) = Muellerella pygmaea
- Pyrenula quercus (A.Massal.) Trevis. (1853) = Cyrtidula quercus
- Pyrenula quinqueseptata (Nyl.) Tuck. (1872) = Polymeridium quinqueseptatum
- Pyrenula quinqueseptata Aptroot (1997) = Pyrenula sexluminata
- Pyrenula rhyponta (Ach.) Trevis. (1853) = Naetrocymbe rhyponta
- Pyrenula salicis (A.Massal.) Trevis. (1853) = Arthopyrenia salicis
- Pyrenula sphaeroides Schaer. (1850) = Zignoella sphaeroides
- Pyrenula staurospora Tuck. ex Willey (1892) = Sulcopyrenula staurospora
- Pyrenula subandamanica Upreti (1998) = Parmentaria andamanensis
- Pyrenula subfarinosa Fée (1825) = Phaeotrema subfarinosum
- Pyrenula submersa (Borrer) Schaer. (1850) = Verrucaria hydrela
- Pyrenula subprostans (Nyl.) Tuck. (1872) = Anisomeridium subprostans
- Pyrenula subsimplex Vain. (1915) = Melanotheca vainioensis
- Pyrenula tetracerae (Ach.) Ach. (1814) = Porina tetracerae
- Pyrenula thelena (Ach.) Trevis. (1853) = Bogoriella thelena
- Pyrenula tremulae (Körb.) Hepp (1860) = Leptorhaphis tremulae
- Pyrenula tropica (Ach.) Trevis. (1853) = Nigrovothelium tropicum
- Pyrenula uberina (Fée) Fée (1837) = Architrypethelium uberinum
- Pyrenula umbonata Ach. (1810) = Pyrenocarpon thelostomum
- Pyrenula umbrata Ach. (1814) = Thelotrema umbratum
- Pyrenula variolosa Pers. (1827) = Anthracothecium variolosum
- Pyrenula ventosicola (Mudd) Willey (1887) = Muellerella ventosicola
- Pyrenula vermicellifera (J.Kunze) Link (1833) = Opegrapha vermicellifera
- Pyrenula verrucosa Ach. (1810) = Polyblastia verrucosa
- Pyrenula wallrothii Hepp (1860) = Mycomicrothelia wallrothii
- Pyrenula zwackhii (Hepp) Hepp (1867) = Thelidium zwackhii
