= Pyrenula abditicarpa =

Scientific classification
- Kingdom: Fungi
- Division: Ascomycota
- Class: Eurotiomycetes
- Order: Pyrenulales
- Family: Pyrenulaceae
- Genus: Pyrenula
- Species: P. abditicarpa

Binomial name
- Pyrenula abditicarpa Aptroot & M.Cáceres (2014)
- Holotype: Serra de Itabaiana National Park, Brazil

Species of lichen

Pyrenula abditicarpa is a species of corticolous (bark-dwelling), crustose lichen in the family Pyrenulaceae. Found in Brazil, it is characterised by ascomata that are deeply immersed in the bark beneath the thallus, with distoseptate muriform ascospores measuring 50–55 μm by 23–25 μm. The species was first identified from a specimen collected in the Serra de Itabaiana National Park, Sergipe, Brazil, at an elevation of approximately 250 m (820 ft).

The thallus of Pyrenula abditicarpa is thin, corticate, olive brown, and smooth, closely adhering to the rough bark of trees. It lacks pseudocyphellae and a prothallus. The ascomata are pyriform, measuring 0.6–0.8 mm in diameter and 1–2 mm deep, with a carbonised wall and a pale brown, depressed ostiole. The hamathecium is not inspersed with oil droplets. The ascospores are irregularly biseriate, brown, and both distoseptate and muriform, with rounded lumina. No pycnidia have been observed. Chemically, the thallus does not react to ultraviolet light, and no lichen products were detected using thin-layer chromatography.

Pyrenula abditicarpa is found on smooth bark in undisturbed Atlantic rainforests and is only known from Brazil. This species is notable for its deeply immersed ascomata and mid-sized muriform ascospores, which distinguish it from others within the genus Pyrenula.

== See also ==
- List of Pyrenula species
