= Pyrenula rinodinospora =

Scientific classification
- Kingdom: Fungi
- Division: Ascomycota
- Class: Eurotiomycetes
- Order: Pyrenulales
- Family: Pyrenulaceae
- Genus: Pyrenula
- Species: P. rinodinospora

Binomial name
- Pyrenula rinodinospora Aptroot (2012)
- Holotype: Budub village, Papua New Guinea

Species of lichen

Pyrenula rinodinospora is a little-known species of corticolous (bark-dwelling) crustose lichen in the family Pyrenulaceae. Found in Papua New Guinea, it was described as a new species by the Dutch lichenologist André Aptroot in 2012. Aptroot had referred to the species in a publication earlier in the year (a world key to Anthracothecium and Pyrenula) as ined., or unpublished.

== Description ==
Pyrenula rinodinospora has a smooth, thin, and continuous surface (thallus) covered by a protective outer layer (cortex). The thallus appears brownish and lacks specialized pores for gas exchange (pseudocyphellae) or embedded crystals. It forms a symbiotic partnership with trentepohlioid algae.

The ascomata (fruiting bodies) of this lichen are small, conical, and scattered across its surface. These black, cone-shaped structures (perithecia) measure about 0.3 to 0.5 mm in diameter and slightly rise above the surface. Their edges are not covered by the surrounding thallus. The ascomatal walls are uniformly darkened (carbonized), extending sideways to form a protective shield-like structure called a clypeus, which includes bark cells between this layer and the main ascomatal wall. They do not contain crystals and show no reaction to chemical tests with potassium hydroxide solution (KOH–).

Each perithecium has a small black opening at the top (ostiole), which also remains unchanged in KOH chemical tests. Internally, these structures contain a clear, jelly-like tissue (hamathecium) densely filled with oil droplets. Within this tissue are cylindrical-to-club-shaped structures (asci), each housing eight spores (ascospores) arranged irregularly.

The ascospores of Pyrenula rinodinospora are dark brown, elongated, and spindle-shaped (fusiform), typically divided into four compartments by three cross-walls (septa). They measure approximately 26–30 μm wide by 110–125 μm long. These spores usually have pointed ends, and their internal compartments (lumina) are mostly four-sided with rounded corners. Unlike some related species, the end compartments of these spores are elongated and directly connected to the spore walls without any separating layer. No secondary asexual reproductive structures (pycnidia) have been observed, and chemical analyses have not detected any unique secondary metabolites within this species.

== See also ==
- List of Pyrenula species
