= Pyrenula cornutispora =

Scientific classification
- Kingdom: Fungi
- Division: Ascomycota
- Class: Eurotiomycetes
- Order: Pyrenulales
- Family: Pyrenulaceae
- Genus: Pyrenula
- Species: P. cornutispora

Binomial name
- Pyrenula cornutispora Aptroot & M.Cáceres (2013)
- Holotype: Fazenda São Francisco, Amazonas, Brazil

Species of lichen-forming fungus

Pyrenula cornutispora is a species of corticolous (bark-dwelling) crustose lichen in the family Pyrenulaceae. The species forms a thin smooth yellowish-brown crust on tree bark and produces tiny hemispherical fruiting bodies 0.4–0.7 mm across that are largely covered by the thallus except for tiny black pores at the top. It is characterized by distinctive horn-shaped spores with tapered, pointed ends that often curve slightly, and is known only from Amazonas state in Brazil.

== Taxonomy ==
Pyrenula cornutispora was described as a new species by André Aptroot and Marcela Cáceres in 2013. The holotype was collected at Fazenda São Francisco (Amazonas, Brazil) off federal highway BR-319, about 30 km (19 mi) north of Porto Velho, on tree bark. The epithet refers to the pointed-ended ascospores noted in the diagnosis.

== Description ==
A thin, smooth yellow‑brown crust distinguishes this species. The thallus spreads widely without forming a border and shows no pseudocyphellae. Its spore‑bearing structures protrude as hemispherical domes that are largely covered by the thallus except for a tiny black pore at the top. These domes occur singly and measure roughly 0.4–0.7 mm across. The hamathecium contains minute colorless oil globules. Each ascus holds eight ascospores arranged in two uneven rows. The spores have three cross‑walls and measure 25–29 μm long and 8–10 μm wide (extremes of 2 μmm and 32 μm have been noted). Their central chambers are broader than long and the end chambers longer than broad; the spore ends taper to sharp or attenuated points and often curve slightly, giving them a horn‑like shape. There is no thickened inner wall at the spore tips. Neither Asexual structures nor secondary metabolites have not been observed.

== Habitat and distribution ==
Pyrenula cornutispora is only known to occur in Amazonas state, Brazil.

== See also ==
- List of Pyrenula species
