= Pyrenula aurantiothallina =

Scientific classification
- Kingdom: Fungi
- Division: Ascomycota
- Class: Eurotiomycetes
- Order: Pyrenulales
- Family: Pyrenulaceae
- Genus: Pyrenula
- Species: P. aurantiothallina

Binomial name
- Pyrenula aurantiothallina C.O.Mendonça, Aptroot & M.Cáceres (2016)
- Type locality: Povoado Ouro Verde, Bahia, Brazil

Species of lichen-forming fungus

Pyrenula aurantiothallina is a crustose (crust-forming), bark-dwelling lichen in the family Pyrenulaceae. It was described as new in 2016 from specimens collected in northeastern Brazil.

It forms a rather thick body (thallus) with a uniformly orange, smooth, dull surface, lacking both pseudocyphellae (tiny pores in the surface) and a visible border zone (prothallus). The algal partner (photobiont) is a trentepohlioid green alga. Its fruiting bodies (perithecia) are partly sunken in the thallus (erumpent), low-conical, and usually 0.7–1.0 mm across, with brown pore-like openings (ostioles) at the apex. The sterile tissue inside the fruiting body (hamathecium) is filled with colorless (hyaline) oil droplets. The asci contain eight ascospores arranged in a single row, which are brown and divided into 4 cells by 3 septa. The spores measure about 19.5–22.5 × 7–8.5 μm, are often slightly pinched at the cross-walls, and have diamond-shaped internal spaces (lumina). Pycnidia (asexual fruiting bodies) were not observed. The thallus gives a purple reaction with potassium hydroxide solution (the K spot test), indicating an anthraquinone pigment; it is UV−, and thin-layer chromatography detected an unidentified anthraquinone.

The species is known from primary forest in Bahia, including the Chapada Diamantina area (type locality near Povoado Ouro Verde–Catolé at about 1,636 m (5,367 ft) elevation), where it grows on smooth bark of trees and branches. Additional collections were reported from the same general locality. It had not been reported from any other Brazilian states as of 2025. The original description compared it with Pyrenula mamillana based on fruiting body and spore characters, separating P. aurantiothallina by its uniformly orange thallus. Other orange-thallus Pyrenula species were noted to differ in ascospore characters.

== See also ==
- List of Pyrenula species
