= Pyrenula guyanensis =

Scientific classification
- Kingdom: Fungi
- Division: Ascomycota
- Class: Eurotiomycetes
- Order: Pyrenulales
- Family: Pyrenulaceae
- Genus: Pyrenula
- Species: P. guyanensis

Binomial name
- Pyrenula guyanensis Aptroot & Sipman (2013)
- Holotype: Cerro Guaiquinima, Bolívar, Venezuela

Species of lichen-forming fungus

Pyrenula guyanensis is a species of corticolous (bark-dwelling) crustose lichen in the family Pyrenulaceae. The species forms a pale yellowish-gray crust with a slightly warted surface and produces dark fruiting bodies (perithecia) in distinct warts up to 1.2 mm wide. It contains lichexanthone, a substance that causes the thallus to fluoresce yellow under ultraviolet light, and grows on tree bark in low open woodlands and savannah scrub on nutrient-poor sandy soils.

== Taxonomy ==
Pyrenula guyanensis was described as new by Harrie Sipman and André Aptroot in 2013. The holotype was collected by Sipman on Cerro Guaiquinima near the northeast edge of the upper plateau in Bolívar, Venezuela; the elevation was about 1,250 m (4,100 ft). The specific epithet reflects its occurrence in the Guayana/Guyana Highlands.

== Description ==
This species forms a pale yellowish‑gray crust several centimeters across that has a slightly warted surface and often a thin black border. A very thin cortex around 5 μm thick encloses the thallus, which lacks white spots and develops within the outer bark (it is epiphloeodic). The perithecia occur in distinct warts that can be 0.8–1.2 mm wide and are somewhat constricted at the base. Each perithecium is more or less spherical (subglobose), up to about 1 mm wide, with a heavily carbonized wall 100–200 μm thick and a black pore at the apex. The hamathecium is densely sprinkled with tiny, 1–3 μm wide colorless droplets. The asci are long and slender (about 150 μm by 15 μm). Each ascus bears eight pale gray‑brown ascospores in a single row. These spores have three cross‑walls (septa), measure 14–20 μm long and 7–10 μm wide, and have lens‑shaped central chambers and more rounded end chambers. They do not develop a thick inner wall at the tips. The thallus contains lichexanthone, which causes it to fluoresce yellow when lit with long-wavelength ultraviolet light.

== Habitat and distribution ==
The corticolous (bark-dwelling) Pyrenula guyanensis is known only from the Guyana Highlands and adjacent areas in Guyana and Venezuela, where it occurs in low, open woodland and savannah scrub on nutrient-poor white sandy soils. No additional location were reported by Aptroot in his 2021 world key to the genus.

== See also ==
- List of Pyrenula species
