= Pyrenula ciliata =

Scientific classification
- Kingdom: Fungi
- Division: Ascomycota
- Class: Eurotiomycetes
- Order: Pyrenulales
- Family: Pyrenulaceae
- Genus: Pyrenula
- Species: P. ciliata

Binomial name
- Pyrenula ciliata Aptroot (1997)
- Holotype: Madang Province, New Guinea

Species of lichen

Pyrenula ciliata is a species of crustose lichen in the family Pyrenulaceae. Described as a new species in 1997 by André Aptroot, it is found in the Madang Province of Papua New Guinea. It occurs in old-growth rainforests, and grows on coconut trees that are on the coast.

The lichen has an olive-coloured, bark-dwelling thallus that lacks pseudocyphellae. Its fruiting bodies are hemispherical perithecia measuring 0.4–0.7 mm in diameter and 0.1–0.3 mm in height. The ascospores are distinctive in being furnished with fine, hair-like appendages grouped in sets of three to eight at both ends. They measure (23–)27–29 × 10–11(–13) micrometres, and have three septa. The photobiont partner is trentepohlioid. Aptroot notes that the ascospore appendages, hitherto unknown in the genus Pyrenula, are not germ tubes but cilia, and are found only in unrelated ascomycetes; as such, the placement of the taxon in this genus was considered provisional. Pyrenula hirsuta is the only other species in the genus with cilia at the apical ends of their spores, but the spores of this species have five to seven septa rather than three.

== See also ==
- List of Pyrenula species
