= Pyrenula minutispora =

Scientific classification
- Kingdom: Fungi
- Division: Ascomycota
- Class: Eurotiomycetes
- Order: Pyrenulales
- Family: Pyrenulaceae
- Genus: Pyrenula
- Species: P. minutispora

Binomial name
- Pyrenula minutispora Aptroot & M.Cáceres (2015)

Species of lichen

Pyrenula minutispora is a species of lichen in the family Pyrenulaceae. This bark-dwelling lichen was scientifically described in 2015 from specimens collected in the Amazon rainforest of Brazil. As its name suggests, the species is distinguished by having unusually small spores compared to related lichens. It grows on smooth tree bark in lowland tropical rainforests and is currently known only from the Brazilian Amazon region.

== Taxonomy ==
Pyrenula minutispora was described as new to science by André Aptroot and Marcela Cáceres. The holotype was collected by the authors from lowland primary rainforest in Rondônia, Brazil, near the Amazonas border. In the authors' multigene phylogeny the species is not nested within the widespread P. aspistea but instead forms a sister relationship with P. parvinuclea, supporting its recognition as a distinct species.

== Description ==
The thallus is thin, dark brown, and at least about 10 cm across; it lacks a prothallus and has no pseudocyphellae (tiny surface pores). The spore-bearing bodies (perithecia) are minute, mostly single, and appear as conical dots that are immersed to slightly emergent (0.2–0.3 mm in diameter). When a few sit side-by-side, their walls remain separate and each keeps its own tiny pore (an apical, pale brown ostiole). Internal tissues are clear (the hamathecium is not inspersed). Each ascus holds eight brown ascospores that have three cross-walls (3-septate), measuring 11–13 × 5–6 μm; the spore cavities (lumina) are mostly rounded (becoming more angular with age), wider than long, and set off from the wall by a thick endospore layer. No pycnidia were seen, and standard chemical tests detected no secondary metabolites.

== Habitat and distribution ==
Pyrenula minutispora is a corticolous lichen; it grows on smooth bark in lowland tropical rainforest. It has been documented from the Brazilian states of Rondônia and Amazonas.

== See also ==
- List of Pyrenula species
