= Pyrenula minoides =

Scientific classification
- Kingdom: Fungi
- Division: Ascomycota
- Class: Eurotiomycetes
- Order: Pyrenulales
- Family: Pyrenulaceae
- Genus: Pyrenula
- Species: P. minoides

Binomial name
- Pyrenula minoides Aptroot & Sipman (2013)
- Holotype: Mount Roraima, Guyana

Species of lichen-forming fungus

Pyrenula minoides is a species of corticolous (bark-dwelling) crustose lichen in the family Pyrenulaceae. The species forms a thin medium to dark brown crust on tree bark and produces flattened cone-shaped fruiting bodies up to 2.5 mm across that are widely spaced across the thallus. It is unusual in producing only four large ascospores per spore sac instead of the typical eight, and is known from humid forests in Guyana and Ecuador.

== Taxonomy ==
This species was described as new by André Aptroot and Harrie Sipman in 2013. The holotype was collected by the authors from the north slope of Mount Roraima (campsite 6) at an elevation of about 1,400 m (4,600 ft) (Upper Mazaruni District, Guyana), where it was collected on the trunk of a forest tree. In the protologue it was compared with P. minae, from which it differs by having four-spored asci and lacking anthraquinone on the fruiting bodies.

== Description ==
This lichen forms a thin, medium to dark brown crust with a smooth, matte surface. It spreads widely on bark and has neither pseudocyphellae nor a border. The perithecia are low, flattened cones 1.0–2.5 mm in diameter. They occur singly and are widely spaced across the thallus. Each has a small apical opening that is brown to black. The hamathecium is clear. Each ascus contains four large, dark brown spores arranged in a single row. These spores have three cross‑walls and measure 27–32 μm long and 12–16 μm wide. They are constricted at the central septum, and their internal cavities are much wider than long; the ends are rounded. Unlike many Pyrenula species, there is no thickened inner wall at the spore tips. Asexual structures and characteristic lichen products are absent.

== Habitat and distribution ==
Pyrenula minoides is a corticolous (bark-dwelling) lichen that grows in humid forests. It occurs in Guyana and Ecuador.

== See also ==
- List of Pyrenula species
