= Pyrenula submicromma =

Scientific classification
- Kingdom: Fungi
- Division: Ascomycota
- Class: Eurotiomycetes
- Order: Pyrenulales
- Family: Pyrenulaceae
- Genus: Pyrenula
- Species: P. submicromma

Binomial name
- Pyrenula submicromma Sipman (2023)
- Holotype: Saül, French Guiana

Species of lichen

Pyrenula submicromma is a species of corticolous (bark-dwelling) crustose lichen in the family Pyrenulaceae. It forms a thin whitish crust on tree bark that glows yellow under ultraviolet light, and produces microscopic spores with an unusual grid-like pattern of internal walls. The species is known only from the outer canopy branches of a single tree in French Guiana's moist lowland forests.

== Taxonomy ==
Pyrenula submicromma was described as new by Harrie Sipman in 2023. The holotype was collected in French Guiana, near Saül ("sentier limonade", 180–210 m), from the outermost canopy branches of Dicorynia guianensis in moist lowland forest. The name refers to its similarity to P. micromma.

Sipman distinguished the species from P. micromma by its larger fruiting bodies (perithecia 0.6–0.8 mm wide vs. 0.4–0.6 mm) and by having submuriform spores—that is, spores with both cross and some lengthwise walls—rather than the narrow, rod-like (bacillar) spores of P. micromma. It also differs from P. guyanensis in having smaller perithecia (0.6–0.8 mm vs. 0.8–1.2 mm). All three belong to a small group in Pyrenula with a whitish thallus situated in the outer bark (epiperidermal) and a distinct white medulla, unlike the olive to brown, embedded (endoperidermal) thalli typical for most species.

== Description ==
The lichen forms a thin, whitish crust (thallus) in the outer bark (epiperidermal), about 50 μm thick, with an approximately 10 μm cortex over a roughly 40 μm white medulla. The thallus contains lichexanthone, which glows yellow under ultraviolet light (UV+), a useful field clue.

The fruiting bodies are simple, black, flask-like perithecia that release spores through a small top pore (an ostiole). They are dispersed, low-hemispherical structures about 0.6–0.8 mm wide, with a hard, carbonized wall about 75 μm thick; they are mostly covered by thallus tissue except at the ostiole, and older specimens often show the black wall where that cover has worn away. The internal tissue between spore sacs (the hamathecium) is clear. Asci are about 85 × 18 μm and may show a small ocular chamber. The eight spores per ascus are arranged in two rows (biseriate) and are broadly spindle-shaped, pale gray-brown, and somewhat muriform (typically 4–6 cross walls with 1–2 lengthwise walls), about 17 × 7 μm; the internal cavities (lumina) are lens-shaped, and old spores turn brown and shrivel.

Spore development is only partly represented in the available material, but the observed sequence is: very young spores are colorless and thin-walled; a median cross wall appears first, followed by additional cross and occasional lengthwise walls; mature spores are pale gray-brown with three main cross walls and 1–3 secondary longitudinal or oblique walls; very old spores become dark brown and shrivel. This matches Sipman's "type 1" pattern.

== Habitat and distribution ==
As of its original description, the species was known only from the type collection in French Guiana, where it grew on the outer canopy branches of Dicorynia guianensis in moist lowland forest on lateritic soils, at roughly 180–210 m elevation.

== See also ==
- List of Pyrenula species
