= Pyrenula flavoinspersa =

Scientific classification
- Kingdom: Fungi
- Division: Ascomycota
- Class: Eurotiomycetes
- Order: Pyrenulales
- Family: Pyrenulaceae
- Genus: Pyrenula
- Species: P. flavoinspersa

Binomial name
- Pyrenula flavoinspersa Aptroot & Sipman (2013)
- Holotype: Reserva Biológica San Francisco, Ecuador

Species of lichen-forming fungus

Pyrenula flavoinspersa is a species of corticolous (bark-dwelling) crustose lichen in the family Pyrenulaceae. The species forms a thick yellowish-gray crust that fluoresces bright yellow under ultraviolet light and produces fruiting bodies almost entirely embedded in the thallus with only tiny black pores visible at the surface. It is distinguished from all other species in its genus by the unique yellow oil droplets that densely pack the tissue between the spore sacs, and is known only from montane forest in Ecuador.

== Taxonomy ==
Pyrenula flavoinspersa was described as a new species by André Aptroot and Harrie Sipman in 2013. The holotype is from the Reserva Biológica San Francisco (Cordillera Numbala, Zamora-Chinchipe Province, Ecuador), collected on a tree trunk in a montane forest. The species epithet refers to the yellow inspersion (minute, scattered oil droplets) of the hamathecium reported by the authors.

== Description ==
The thallus of this lichen is thick, oily and yellowish gray, fluorescing bright yellow under ultraviolet light. It is smooth and lacks pseudocyphellae. The perithecia are almost entirely embedded in the thallus; they are more or less spherical, 0.4–0.7 mm in diameter, with a tiny black pore at the top. In cross‑section the hamathecium is packed with yellow oil droplets that coalesce when cut and do not change color in alkali solution. Each ascus contains eight ascospores arranged in two uneven rows. The spores have three cross‑walls (septa) and measure 29–35 μm long and 11–13 μm wide. Young spores have internal cavities (lumina) that are nearly fused and partly filled with yellow oil; as the spores mature these cavities become angular to diamond‑shaped, and a thick inner wall develops at the tips. No asexual reproductive structures are known. The thallus contains lichexanthone, and the yellow inspersion of the hamathecium is unique among Pyrenula species.

== Habitat and distribution ==
As of its original collection, the corticolous (bark-dwelling) Pyrenula flavoinspersa was known only from the type specimen in the type locality, a montane forest in Ecuador. No additional location were reported by Aptroot in his 2021 world key to the genus.

== See also ==
- List of Pyrenula species
