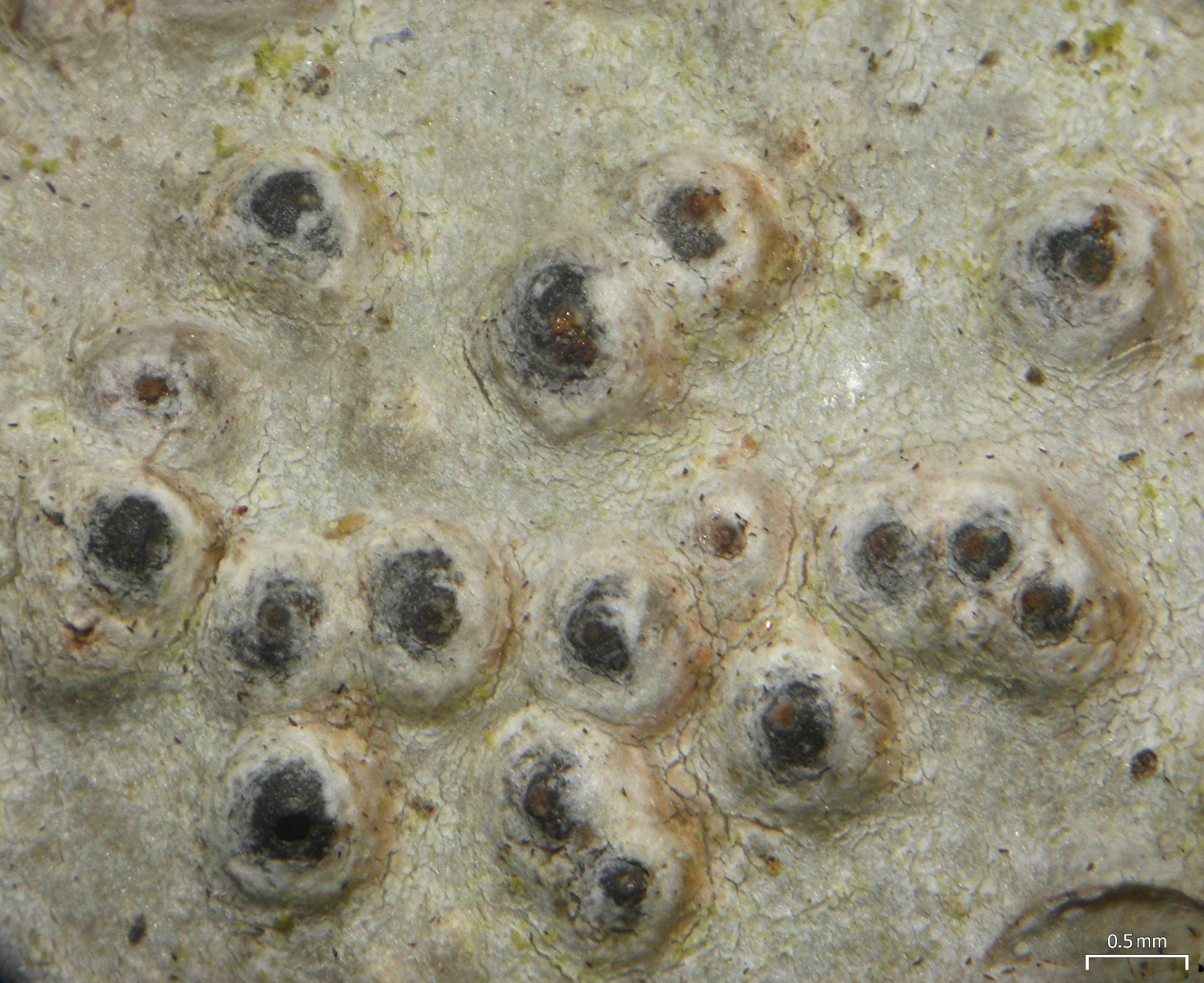

Scientific classification
- Kingdom: Fungi
- Division: Ascomycota
- Class: Eurotiomycetes
- Order: Pyrenulales
- Family: Pyrenulaceae
- Genus: Pyrenula
- Species: P. leucostoma

Binomial name
- Pyrenula leucostoma Ach.

Synonyms
- Synonymy: Anthracothecium americanum (Ach.) Müll. Arg.; Anthracothecium emergens (Leight.) Zahlbr.; Anthracothecium endococcineum (Vain.) Zahlbr.; Anthracothecium erythrinae (Vain.) Zahlbr.; Anthracothecium fraternale Zahlbr.; Anthracothecium leucostomum (Ach.) Malme; Anthracothecium libricola (Fée) Müll.; Anthracothecium javanicum (Hepp) Zahlbr.; Anthracothecium obscuratum Upreti & Ajay Singh; Anthracothecium pachycheilum (Tuck.) Zahlbr.; Anthracothecium paramerum (Nyl.) Müll. Arg.; Anthracothecium submucosum (Vain.) Zahlbr.; Bottaria endococcinea Vain.; Bottaria erythrinae Vain.; Bottaria libricola (Fée) Vain.; Bottaria paramera (Nyl.) Vain.; Bottaria submucosa Vain.; Parmentaria rappii Zahlbr.; Porina javanica (Hepp) Overeem, Bull.; Pyrenula libricola Fée; Pyrenula pachycheila Tuck.; Pyrenula reebiae Aptroot & Gueidan; Sporodictyon feei Trevis.; Verrucaria analepta var. americana Ach.; Verrucaria emergens Leight.; Verrucaria javanica Hepp; Verrucaria leucostoma (Ach.) Mont.; Verrucaria libricola (Fée) Nyl.; Verrucaria paramera Nyl.

= Pyrenula leucostoma =

Species of lichen

Pyrenula leucostoma is a species of corticolous (bark-dwelling), crustose lichen in the family Pyrenulaceae.

== Description ==
Pyrenula leucostoma is a crustose lichen that has a grey-brown and brown to olive green thallus, and subglobose black ascomata which measure 0.5–1.5 mm (0.020–0.059 in) in diameter.

== Taxonomy ==
The lichen was formally described as a new species by Swedish botanist Erik Acharius in 1814.

== Distribution and habitat ==
The species is pantropical, found in areas including Southeastern North America, the Caribbean and Australia, in eastern Queensland, New South Wales and on Norfolk Island. It was first recognised as being present in New Zealand in 2015. The species is often found in open, coastal habitats and shaded forests, found on the bark of hardwood trees. In Nepal, P. leucostoma has been reported from 2,400 to 2,600 m elevation in a compilation of published records.

== Gallery ==
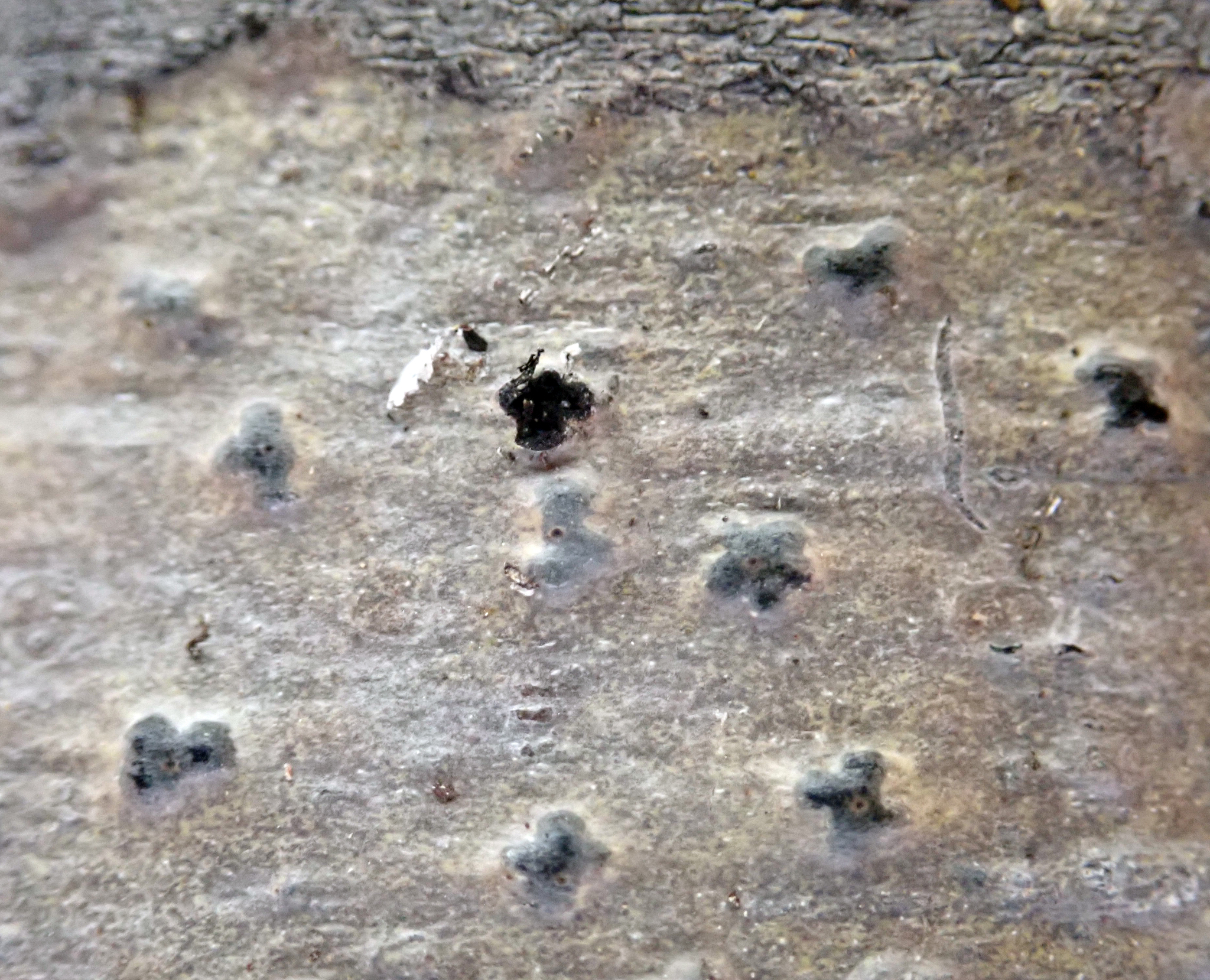

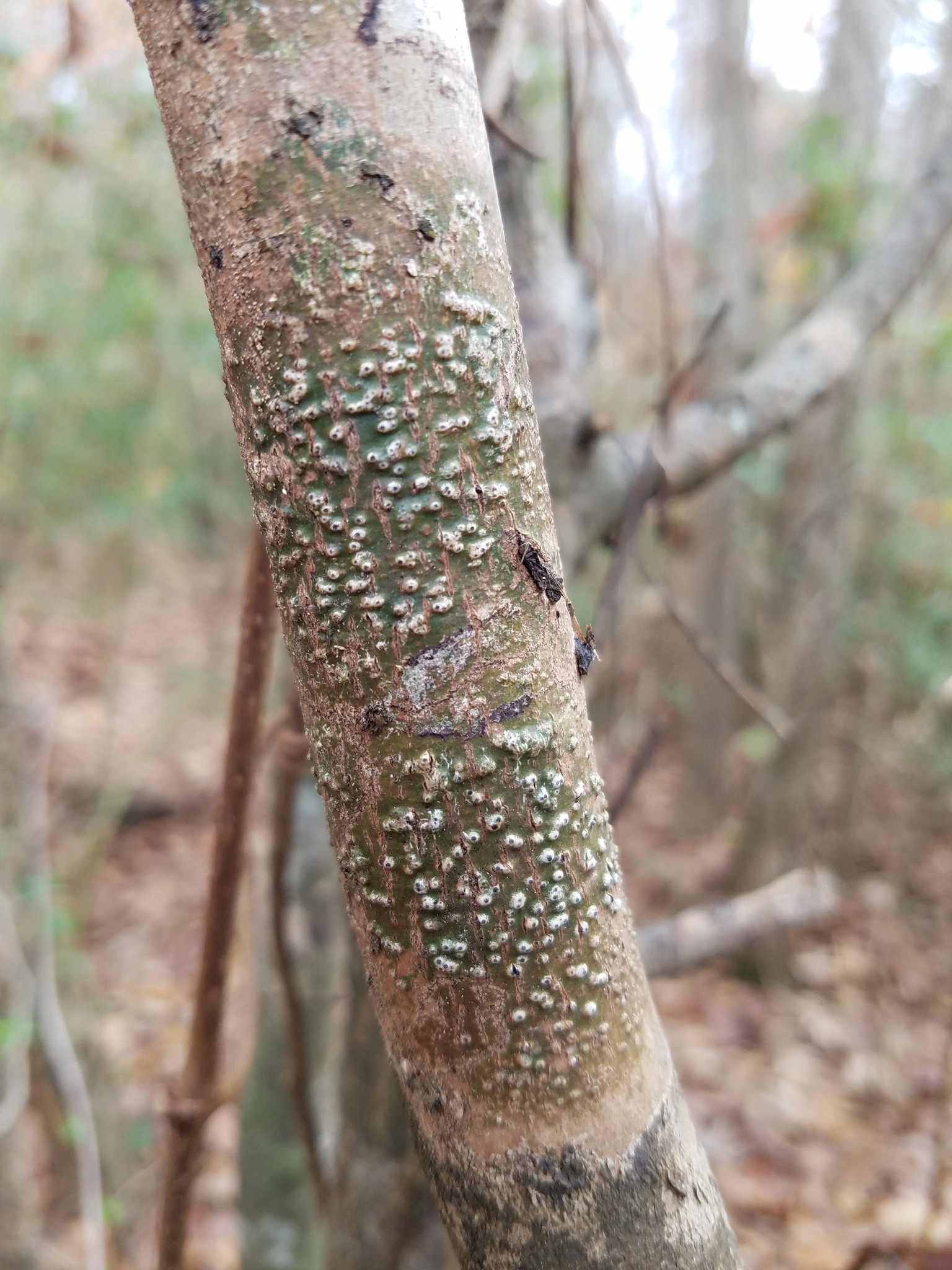

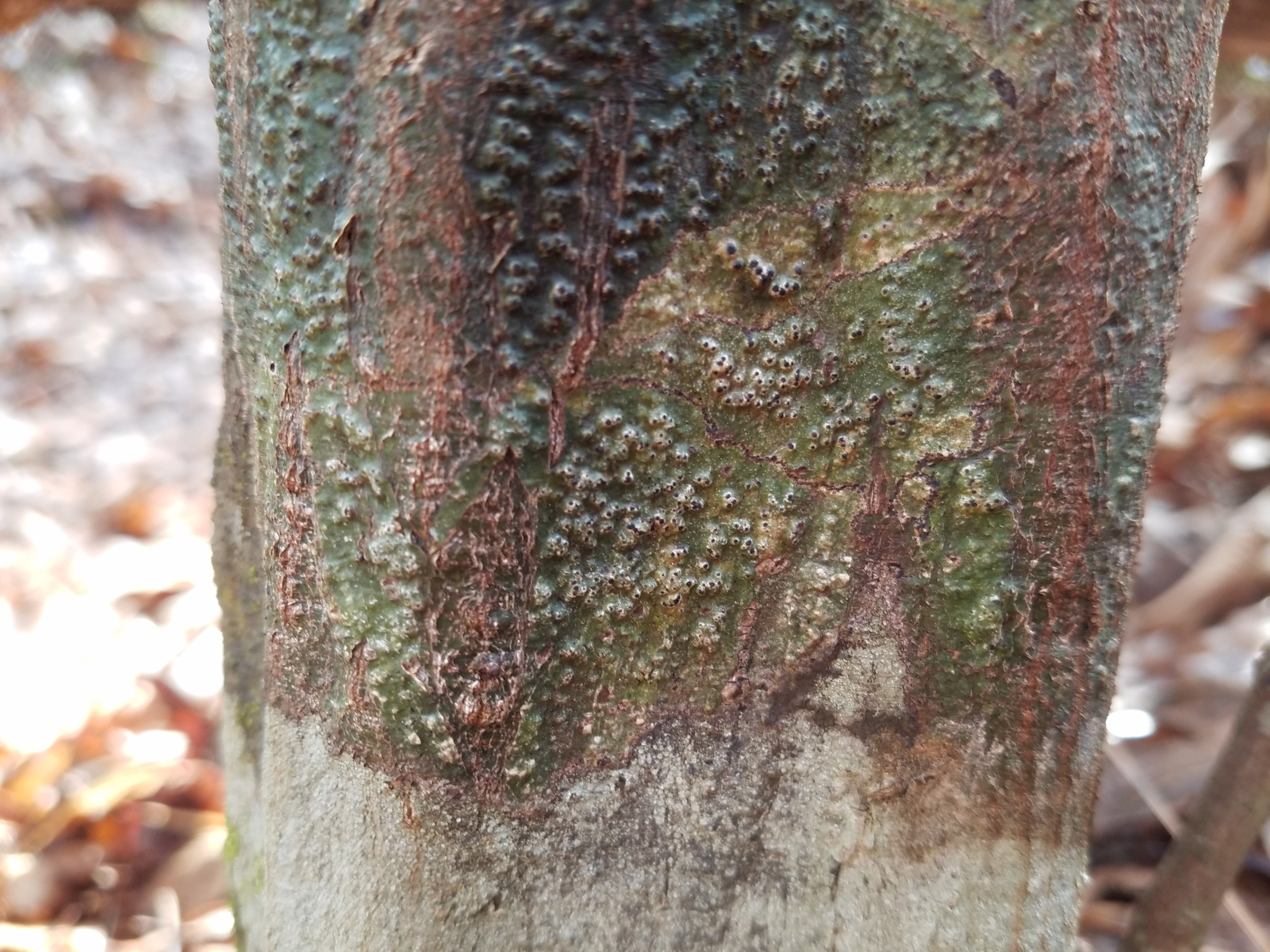

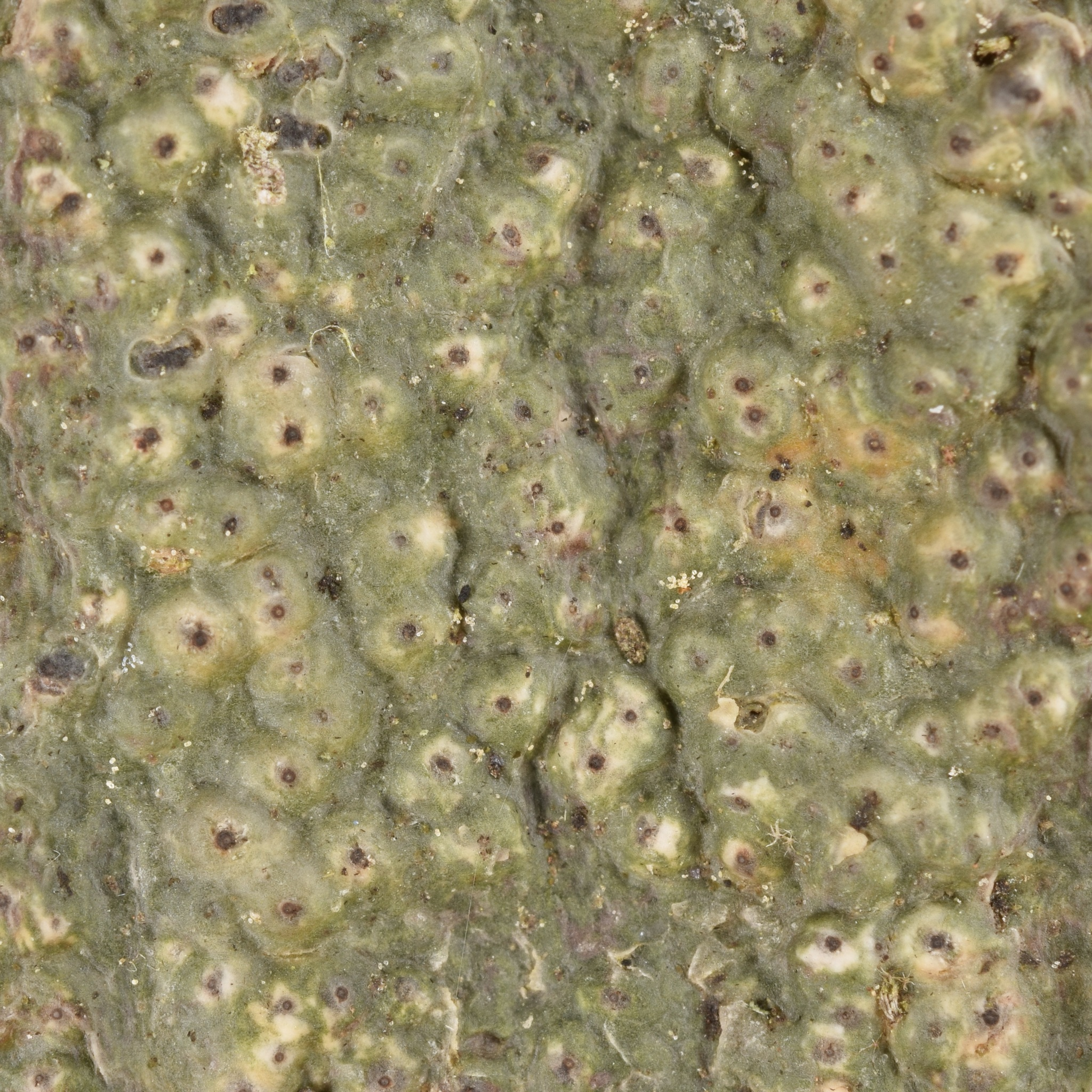

== See also ==
- List of Pyrenula species
