= Pyrenula triangularis =

Scientific classification
- Kingdom: Fungi
- Division: Ascomycota
- Class: Eurotiomycetes
- Order: Pyrenulales
- Family: Pyrenulaceae
- Genus: Pyrenula
- Species: P. triangularis

Binomial name
- Pyrenula triangularis Aptroot & Sipman (2013)
- Holotype: Serra dos Órgãos National Park, Guyana

Species of lichen-forming fungus

Pyrenula triangularis is a species of corticolous (bark-dwelling) crustose lichen in the family Pyrenulaceae. The species is characterised by its distinctive conical fruiting bodies (perithecia) that typically grow in groups of two to four and merge to form a single triangular or irregularly shaped mass on the bark surface. It produces relatively large ascospores divided by multiple cross-walls and one to three lengthwise walls, a spore type known as muriform.

== Taxonomy ==
This species was described as new by Harrie Sipman and André Aptroot in 2013. The holotype was collected in Serra dos Órgãos National Park (Rio de Janeiro state, Brazil) at roughly 1,600–2,000 m elevation, along the track from Abrigo 2, on tree bark. The authors distinguished it from similar species such as P. circumfiniens based on spore features and by differences in ostiole position and endospore development. The species epithet triangularis alludes to the often triangle-shaped pseudostromata.

== Description ==
This species produces a very thin, gray‑brown crust framed by a narrow black line. Its perithecia are conical and sit on the surface, measuring 0.6–1.0 mm across. They usually occur in groups of two to four; the perithecia in a group merge their walls and pores to form a single superficial mass (a pseudostroma) that often looks triangular from above. In vertical section each conical component is 1.0–2.0 mm wide. The pores are lateral rather than apical and are often depressed and whitish. The hamathecium is clear, without oil droplets. Each ascus yields eight ascospores arranged in two rows. The spores are muriform—divided by five transverse walls and one to three longitudinal walls—and measure 25–31 μm long and 12–16 μm wide. Their internal cavities are rounded, and a thickened inner wall is present at the tips. No asexual structures are known in this species.

== Habitat and distribution ==
As of its original description, Pyrenula triangularis was known only from the type collection in Guyana. No additional location were reported by Aptroot in his 2021 world key to the genus.

== See also ==
- List of Pyrenula species
