= Pyrenula maritima =

Scientific classification
- Kingdom: Fungi
- Division: Ascomycota
- Class: Eurotiomycetes
- Order: Pyrenulales
- Family: Pyrenulaceae
- Genus: Pyrenula
- Species: P. maritima

Binomial name
- Pyrenula maritima Aptroot & Sipman (2013)
- Holotype: Aconcagua, Chile

Species of lichen-forming fungus

Pyrenula maritima is a species of corticolous (bark-dwelling) crustose lichen in the family Pyrenulaceae. The species forms smooth pale olive to yellowish-brown patches on twigs and small branches, with fruiting bodies that are either immersed in the thallus or form slightly raised black hemispheres. It is known from coastal shrubland in the arid zone of central Chile, where it grows in sites regularly affected by fog from the Pacific Ocean.

== Taxonomy ==
This species was described as new to science in 2013 by the lichenologists Harrie Sipman and André Aptroot. The holotype specimen originates from coastal headlands at Punto Los Molles, Aconcagua, Chile. It was collected by William Alfred Weber in November 1976, on twigs and branches of Gayella valparadisaea in an isolate grove.

== Description ==
This lichen forms smooth, pale olive to yellowish‑brown patches on twigs and small branches. The thallus may be several centimeters across and about 50–100 μm thick, often breaking into a mosaic of small individuals bordered by thin black lines. It penetrates the outer bark and is covered by a 10–25 μm thick outer layer. The perithecia are immersed in the thallus or form slightly raised, poorly defined warts about 0.5 mm wide; sometimes they become exposed as small black hemispheres. Each perithecium has a carbonized wall 25–75 μm thick and an apical or subapical black pore. The hamathecium is usually clear; the supporting filaments are about 1 μm wide and unbranched. The asci measure roughly 110 μm by 12 μm and contain eight ascospores in a single row. The spores have three cross‑walls and are 15–25 μm long and 6–10 μm wide, pale gray‑brown in color. Their internal cavities (lumina) are lens‑shaped and there is a thickened inner wall at the ends; in very young spores the apical thickening develops before the cross‑walls (septa) form. Asexual pycnidia may appear along the margin as low black warts about 150 μm wide, producing curved conidia about 25 μm long and 0.5 μm wide.

== Habitat and distribution ==
This species occurs in coastal shrubland in the arid zone of central Chile, in sites that are regularly affected by fog from the Pacific Ocean.

== See also ==
- List of Pyrenula species
