= Pyrenula pyrenastrospora =

Scientific classification
- Kingdom: Fungi
- Division: Ascomycota
- Class: Eurotiomycetes
- Order: Pyrenulales
- Family: Pyrenulaceae
- Genus: Pyrenula
- Species: P. pyrenastrospora

Binomial name
- Pyrenula pyrenastrospora Aptroot (1997)
- Holotype: Balek Wildlife Reserve, Papua New Guinea

Species of lichen

Pyrenula pyrenastrospora is a species of corticolous (bark-dwelling) crustose lichen in the family Pyrenulaceae. Described as a new species in 1997 by André Aptroot, it is found in the Madang Province of Papua New Guinea. The type specimen was collected by Aptroot in the Balek Wildlife Reverse, where it was growing on a tree trunk in a lowland rainforest. It has also been recorded from the Cotigao Wildlife Sanctuary in Goa, India.

The thallus is reddish-brown in colour, and lacks pseudocyphellae. The perithecia (fruiting bodies) are superficial and flattened, measuring 0.4–0.6 mm in diameter. The ascospores have elongated outer cells (lumen portions) and measure 18–20 × 5.5–7.5 μm. The terminal lumina that lie directly against the exospore wall are a feature that helps distinguish this species from others Pyrenula species. Pyrenula minarum is similar in morphology, but differs in having a hamathecium (the tissue between the asci) that contains granular material, and ostioles (pore openings) that are often positioned off-centre.

== See also ==
- List of Pyrenula species
