= Pyrenula rubrolateralis =

Scientific classification
- Kingdom: Fungi
- Division: Ascomycota
- Class: Eurotiomycetes
- Order: Pyrenulales
- Family: Pyrenulaceae
- Genus: Pyrenula
- Species: P. rubrolateralis

Binomial name
- Pyrenula rubrolateralis Aptroot & M.Cáceres (2014)
- Holotype: Mata do Crasto, Sergipe, Brazil

Species of lichen

Pyrenula rubrolateralis is a species of corticolous (bark-dwelling), crustose lichen in the family Pyrenulaceae. Found in Brazil, this species is distinguished by its eccentric (not centrally positioned) red ostioles (the openings of the fruiting bodies). Its ascospores are 3-septate, meaning they are divided into four sections, and measure 20–24 μm by 8–10 μm.

The type specimen of Pyrenula rubrolateralis was collected from Mata do Crasto in Santa Luzia do Itanhy, Sergipe, Brazil, at an elevation of approximately 10 m (33 ft). The thallus (the main body of the lichen) is thin, up to 0.1 mm thick, and olive green, following the cracks and fissures in the bark. It lacks pseudocyphellae (tiny pores on the surface) and is bordered by a black prothallus (a border around the thallus) about 1 mm wide. The ascomata (fruiting bodies) are immersed in the raised areas of the bark and almost completely covered by the thallus. They are pyriform (pear-shaped), 0.6–0.9 mm in diameter, and single. The walls of the ascomata are carbonised (blackened) all around. The ostioles are eccentric (off-centre), red-brown to bright red, and can be flush with the surface or distinctly convex. The hamathecium, the tissue between the asci, does not contain oil droplets. The ascospores are brown, irregularly biseriate (arranged in two rows), with mostly rounded to somewhat diamond-shaped internal cavities separated from the wall by a thick layer. The ends of the ascospores are pointed.

Pyrenula rubrolateralis does not have pycnidia (small asexual fruiting bodies). Chemically, the ostioles do not react with potassium hydroxide (K–), the thallus does not fluoresce under ultraviolet light, and no substances were detected using thin-layer chromatography.

Pyrenula rubrolateralis grows on smooth bark in undisturbed Atlantic rainforests and is only found in Brazil. This species is characterised by its eccentric red ostioles. It is similar to the North American species Pyrenula wetmorei, which differs by having an inspersed hamathecium (containing oil droplets) and ascospores with black pigment bands that obscure the septa.

== See also ==
- List of Pyrenula species
