= Pyrenula grossa =

Scientific classification
- Kingdom: Fungi
- Division: Ascomycota
- Class: Eurotiomycetes
- Order: Pyrenulales
- Family: Pyrenulaceae
- Genus: Pyrenula
- Species: P. grossa

Binomial name
- Pyrenula grossa Aptroot (1997)
- Holotype: Mount Wilhelm, Papua New Guinea

Species of lichen

Pyrenula grossa is a species of corticolous (bark-dwelling) crustose lichen in the family Pyrenulaceae. Described as a new species in 1997 by André Aptroot, it is found in the Chimbu Province of Papua New Guinea. The type specimen was collected by Aptroot in the Pindaunde valley of Mount Wilhelm, where it was growing on a tree at an elevation around 3600 m.

The thallus, which measures up to 10 cm across, has a blistered and areolate surface that is thick and dark brown. Pseudocyphellae are absent. The perithecia (fruiting bodies) are spherical and remain immersed in the thallus, measuring 0.8–1.0 mm in diameter. The ascospores, which resemble those of Pyrenula pseudobufonia, are broadly ellipsoid and relatively large, measuring 32–39 × 19–32 micrometres. It is distinguished from other Pyrenula species by its relatively large ascospore size and the black granular material at the spore ends.

== See also ==
- List of Pyrenula species
