= Pyrenula tetraspora =

Scientific classification
- Kingdom: Fungi
- Division: Ascomycota
- Class: Eurotiomycetes
- Order: Pyrenulales
- Family: Pyrenulaceae
- Genus: Pyrenula
- Species: P. tetraspora

Binomial name
- Pyrenula tetraspora Aptroot & Sipman (2013)
- Holotype: Cerro Guaiquinima, Venezuela

Species of lichen-forming fungus

Pyrenula tetraspora is a species of corticolous (bark-dwelling) crustose lichen in the family Pyrenulaceae. The species is distinguished by its unusually large ascospores, with each spore-bearing sac (ascus) containing only four spores instead of the typical eight found in most related species. It forms a relatively thick pale gray crust on smooth bark in montane forests and is known only from its type locality on Cerro Guaiquinima in Venezuela at around 800 m elevation.

== Taxonomy ==
This species was described as new by André Aptroot and Harrie Sipman in 2013. The holotype originates from the upper plateau of the Cerro Guaiquinima, along the Río Carapo near "camp 3-nuevo") in Estado Bolívar Venezuela, where it was collected on tree bark at about 800 m (2,600 ft) elevation.

== Description ==
This lichen has a relatively thick, pale gray crust on bark that lacks pseudocyphellae or a border. The fruiting bodies (perithecia) are hemispherical and sit on the surface but are usually covered by a thin film of thallus tissue. They measure 0.7–1.2 mm across. The pores are slightly skewed and may face various directions; they appear brown. The hamathecium contains scattered colorless oil droplets and gives a reddish reaction when stained with iodine. Each ascus carries four large spores instead of eight. These spores have five cross‑walls (septa) and measure about 60–65 μm long and 18–24 μm wide. Their internal cavities are angular to diamond‑shaped, and, unlike many relatives, there is no thickened inner wall at the ends. No asexual structures have been recorded.

== Habitat and distribution ==
As of its original publication, Pyrenula tetraspora was known only from its type locality in Venezuela, where it grows on smooth bark in montane forest. No additional location were reported by Aptroot in his 2021 world key to the genus Pyrenula.

== See also ==
- List of Pyrenula species
