= Pyrenula media =

Scientific classification
- Kingdom: Fungi
- Division: Ascomycota
- Class: Eurotiomycetes
- Order: Pyrenulales
- Family: Pyrenulaceae
- Genus: Pyrenula
- Species: P. media

Binomial name
- Pyrenula media Aptroot (1997)
- Holotype: Yupna valley, New Guinea

Species of lichen

Pyrenula media is a species of corticolous (bark-dwelling) crustose lichen in the family Pyrenulaceae. Described as a new species in 1997 by André Aptroot, it is found in the Madang Province of Papua New Guinea. The type specimen was collected by Aptroot from the Yupna valley in Finisterre Range, where it was found on a tree in a mossy mountain forest at an elevation between 2,300 and 2,750 m (7,550 and 9,020 ft). The lichen has also been recorded from Sri Lanka.

The thallus has a yellowish-brown colouration and lacks pseudocyphellae (pores for gas exchange). The perithecia are hemispherical and become emergent from the thallus surface, measuring 0.6–1.3 mm in diameter. The ascospores are divided by three constrictions, giving them a four-celled appearance, and measure 24–29 × 9–11 micrometres.

== See also ==
- List of Pyrenula species
