= Pyrenula violaceastroidea =

Scientific classification
- Kingdom: Fungi
- Division: Ascomycota
- Class: Eurotiomycetes
- Order: Pyrenulales
- Family: Pyrenulaceae
- Genus: Pyrenula
- Species: P. violaceastroidea

Binomial name
- Pyrenula violaceastroidea C.O.Mendonça, Aptroot & M.Cáceres (2016)
- Type locality: Guaribas Biological Reserve, Brazil

Species of lichen-forming fungus

Pyrenula violaceastroidea is a crustose (crust-forming), bark-dwelling lichen in the family Pyrenulaceae. It was described as new in 2016 from specimens collected in northeastern Brazil (Paraíba).

The thallus is thin and corticate, partly pale brown but mostly wine-red to purplish streaked, with a shiny surface and a black border line (prothallus). The algal partner (photobiont) is a trentepohlioid green alga. The lichen's fruiting bodies (perithecia) are immersed to partly exposed (erumpent), 0.3–0.5 mm across, and pear-shaped, usually forming clusters of 3–6 perithecia that share a single opening but do not have fused walls (a "parmentarioid" arrangement). The shared opening (ostiole) is lateral and black, with red pruina (a surface "dusting") that can extend over parts of the fruiting bodies and onto the thallus. The sterile tissue inside the fruiting body (hamathecium) is not filled with oil droplets (not inspersed). The asci contain eight ascospores in a single row. The brown spores are 3-septate and measure 16–21 × 6–7 μm, often somewhat club-shaped, with rounded to diamond-shaped internal spaces (lumina) and no surface ornamentation. Pycnidia (asexual fruiting bodies) were not observed. The pigment turns purple with potassium hydroxide solution (the K spot test), it is UV−, and thin-layer chromatography detected an unidentified anthraquinone.

The species was originally known from primary restinga forest at Guaribas Biological Reserve (Mamanguape, Paraíba), where it grows on smooth bark of trees and branches at about 207 m (679 ft) elevation; it has been collected growing alongside Dyplolabia afzelii. In the original description, it was reported as the first "parmentarioid" Pyrenula with a red pigment, and was compared with Pyrenula septicollaris, from which it differs by its clear wine-red to purplish coloration. Pyrenula violaceastroidea has since been recorded from the Brazilian state Bahia.

== See also ==
- List of Pyrenula species
