= Pyrenula fusoluminata =

Scientific classification
- Kingdom: Fungi
- Division: Ascomycota
- Class: Eurotiomycetes
- Order: Pyrenulales
- Family: Pyrenulaceae
- Genus: Pyrenula
- Species: P. fusoluminata

Binomial name
- Pyrenula fusoluminata Aptroot (2002)

Species of lichen

Pyrenula fusoluminata is a species of corticolous (bark-dwelling), crustose lichen in the family Pyrenulaceae, described as a new species in 2002. Found in the forests of Minas Gerais, Brazil, this species is distinguished by its unique spindle-shaped ascospores, which are more than four times as long than they are wide.

== Taxonomy ==
Pyrenula fusoluminata was described in 2002 by the Dutch lichenologist André Aptroot from specimens he collected in the Serra do Caraça in Minas Gerais, Brazil. It represents a distinct species within the genus Pyrenula, notable for its ascospores structure. The species epithet alludes to the lumina (internal spaces) in its fusiform (spindle-shaped) spores.

== Description ==
The thallus of Pyrenula fusoluminata is crustose, reaching up to 10 cm in diameter, with a yellowish brown colour and a somewhat glossy finish without any pseudocyphellae or visible hypothallus. It hosts sparse Trentepohlia-like green algae and is primarily corticate. All standard chemical spot tests are negative on the lichen, indicating a lack of secondary metabolites (lichen products).

Perithecia (fruiting bodies) are hemispherical and black, measuring 0.7–1.2 mm in diameter, with the basal half often covered by the thallus. The perithecial wall is thick and entirely devoid of crystals. The ostiole at the centre appears as a black depression.

The hymenium contains numerous oil globules, remains hyaline, and does not react to staining with iodine. Asci (spore-bearing cells) are cylindrical to clavate (club-shaped), measuring approximately 95–110 by 8–11 μm, and typically contain four, occasionally five, ascospores. These spores are irregularly arranged, mostly towards the tips of the asci, chocolate brown in colour, and distinctly fusiform with attenuated ends. Each ascospore is divided into four lumina, with the central two being significantly longer than the end ones. Pyrenula fusoluminata is one of 15 Pyrenula species with ascospores over four times long as wide (out of more than 200 in the genus); unlike P. fusoluminata, some of the others examples have highly attenuated lower ends that resemble "tail"-like structures.

== Habitat and distribution ==
This species was discovered on a shaded tree within a forest remnant in the Serra do Caraça, Brazil. It grows in association with species from the lichen genus Phyllopsora.

== See also ==
- List of Pyrenula species
