= Pyrenula aurantioinspersa =

Scientific classification
- Kingdom: Fungi
- Division: Ascomycota
- Class: Eurotiomycetes
- Order: Pyrenulales
- Family: Pyrenulaceae
- Genus: Pyrenula
- Species: P. aurantioinspersa

Binomial name
- Pyrenula aurantioinspersa Aptroot & Sipman (2013)

Species of lichen-forming fungus

Pyrenula aurantioinspersa is a species of corticolous (bark-dwelling) crustose lichen in the family Pyrenulaceae. The species was described in 2013 from a specimen collected on a tree trunk in the Venezuelan Andes near Mérida at an elevation of about 1,600 meters. It is distinguished by its thick, yellowish-grey thallus and unusual orange oil droplets in the tissue between its spore sacs, which turn green when treated with alkaline solution. As of 2021, this lichen remains known only from its original collection site in Venezuela.

== Taxonomy ==
Pyrenula aurantioinspersa was described as new to science by André Aptroot and Harrie Sipman in 2013. The holotype was collected by Sipman in the Valley of the Rio Chama near Mérida (State of Mérida, Venezuela), from a shaded tree trunk at about 1,600 m (5,200 ft) elevation.

The species name refers to the diagnostic orange inspersion in the hamathecium (oil droplets that appear greenish in KOH), a feature the authors used to separate it from related Pyrenula species.

== Description ==
This species has a thick, greasy‑looking thallus that is yellowish gray and punctuated with tiny pseudocyphellae—small pale spots where the surface layer is interrupted. The crust has no distinct border. Its sexual reproductive bodies (perithecia) are almost spherical and break through the surface, measuring about 0.8–1.3 mm across. Each has a small pore at the tip that appears brown. The tissues between the spore sacs (the hamathecium) are filled with numerous orange oil droplets which change to a green hue in alkaline solution, an unusual reaction in the genus. Within each ascus there are eight large ascospores arranged loosely in two rows. These spores have three cross‑walls and are about 60–75 μm long by 24–28 μm wide. When young they are colorless and lack wall thickenings; as they mature they become grayish brown and gelatinous thickenings develop around the internal chambers. In very old spores the thickenings form rings around the cross‑walls and the walls between them become constricted. Asexual reproductive structures (pycnidia) occur along the edge of the thallus. A reddish‑orange anthraquinone pigment present in the tissues reacts characteristically with potassium hydroxide solution.

== Habitat and distribution ==
Pyrenula aurantioinspersa is a corticolous (bark-dwelling) lichen. As of its original publication, it was known to occur only from its type locality in Venezuela, and no additional locations were reported in a 2021 world key to the genus Pyrenula.

== See also ==
- List of Pyrenula species
