= Pyrenula flavida =

Scientific classification
- Kingdom: Fungi
- Division: Ascomycota
- Class: Eurotiomycetes
- Order: Pyrenulales
- Family: Pyrenulaceae
- Genus: Pyrenula
- Species: P. flavida

Binomial name
- Pyrenula flavida Sipman (2023)
- Holotype: Kuyuwini Landing, Upper Takutu-Upper Essequibo Region, Guyana

Species of lichen

Pyrenula flavida is a species of corticolous (bark-dwelling) crustose lichen in the family Pyrenulaceae. It is the only species in its genus with a greenish-yellow coloration, making it readily recognizable among related bark-dwelling lichens. The species is known only from a single tree in a small savanna area of southern Guyana.

== Taxonomy ==
Pyrenula flavida was described as new by Harrie Sipman in 2023. The holotype was collected in southern Guyana near Kuyuwini Landing, Upper Takutu-Upper Essequibo Region (Region 9), at about 230 m elevation, on canopy branches of a solitary Agonandra brasiliensis tree. The species epithet refers to its yellow thallus.

Within Pyrenula, it is set apart by a greenish-yellow thallus (unique in the genus) and small brown, 3-septate spores; Sipman compared it directly with P. cerina, which has an orange thallus, much larger spores (26–42 × 12–15 μm), and occurs in mangroves rather than inland forests.

== Description ==
This is a bark-dwelling lichen with a thin, pale greenish-yellow body (thallus) embedded in the outer bark (endoperidermal). Under ultraviolet light the thallus fluoresces reddish (UV+). Chemical spot tests indicate an unidentified yellow pigment: the thallus is K+ (dark red) and, in section, K+ (orange and dissolving). Thin-layer chromatography shows a single spot that may correspond to 4-chloroemodin.

The fruiting bodies are black, flask-like structures (perithecia) that release spores through a small top pore (an ostiole). They are initially immersed in the bark, soon become emergent, and can appear almost stalked; each is about 0.6–0.8 mm wide with a hard, carbonized wall (exciple) and an apical black ostiole. The internal tissue between the spore sacs (hamathecium) is clear. The spore sacs (asci) are cylindrical, about 80 × 10 μm, sometimes with a tiny ocular chamber. The spores are produced eight to an ascus, arranged in a single row, and mature from pale gray to brown; they are broadly spindle-shaped, three-septate, and around 11 × 6–7 μm in size, with rounded to lens-shaped internal cavities (lumina) and thick lateral walls. Unlike some relatives, the spores do not shrivel with age.

== Habitat and distribution ==
The only known specimen was taken from the canopy of an isolated tree in a small lowland savanna near Kuyuwini Landing, Guyana; the site is an inland setting and the savanna has been expanded by bushfires. At the time of its original description the species was known only from this locality.

== See also ==
- List of Pyrenula species
