= Pyrenula albonigra =

Scientific classification
- Kingdom: Fungi
- Division: Ascomycota
- Class: Eurotiomycetes
- Order: Pyrenulales
- Family: Pyrenulaceae
- Genus: Pyrenula
- Species: P. albonigra

Binomial name
- Pyrenula albonigra Aptroot, D.S.Andrade & M.Cáceres (2014)
- Holotype: Refúgio de Vida Silvestre Mata do Junco, Brazil

Species of lichen

Pyrenula albonigra is a species of corticolous (bark-dwelling), crustose lichen in the family Pyrenulaceae. Found in Brazil, this species is notable for its pale grey, somewhat glossy thallus (the main body of the lichen) that also covers the ascomata (fruiting bodies), except for a prominent black opening (ostiole). The ascospores are 3-septate, meaning they are divided into four sections, and measure 17–20 μm by 7–9 μm.

The type specimen of Pyrenula albonigra was collected from the Mata do Junco Wildlife Refuge in Sergipe, Brazil, at an elevation of 150 m (490 ft). The thallus is thin, mineral grey, and lacks tiny pores called pseudocyphellae. It is bordered by a black line (a prothallus) up to 1 mm wide. The ascomata are superficial, hemispherical, 0.3–0.4 mm in diameter, and covered by the thallus except for a wide black area around the ostiole. The wall of the ascomata is carbonised (blackened) all around. The hamathecium, a layer of tissue in the ascomata, does not contain oil droplets. The ascospores are brown, irregularly arranged in the asci, and have diamond-shaped inner cavities separated from the wall by a thick layer.

Pyrenula albonigra does not show any reaction under ultraviolet light, and no lichen products were detected using thin-layer chromatography. It grows on smooth bark in undisturbed Atlantic rainforests and is only known to occur in Brazil.

== See also ==
- List of Pyrenula species
