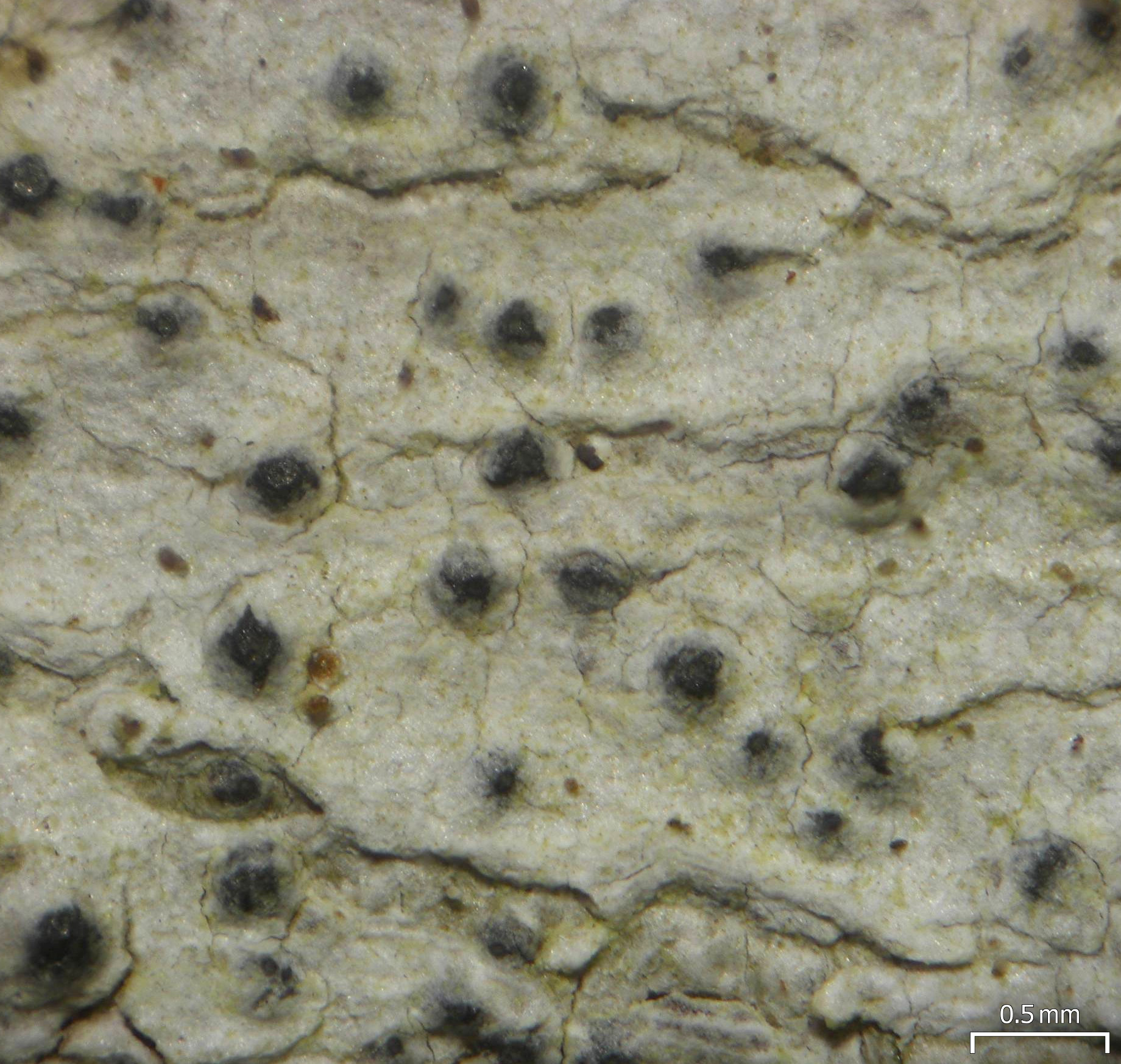
- Growing on the bark of red maple in North Carolina, USA. Scale bar = 0.5 mm

Scientific classification
- Domain: Eukaryota
- Kingdom: Fungi
- Division: Ascomycota
- Class: Eurotiomycetes
- Order: Pyrenulales
- Family: Pyrenulaceae
- Genus: Pyrenula
- Species: P. microcarpa

Binomial name
- Pyrenula microcarpa Müll.Arg. (1885)

Synonyms
- Synonymy: Collema microcarpoides (Müll. Arg.; Pyrenula conspurcata Müll. Arg.; Pyrenula melaleuca Müll. Arg.; Pyrenula microcarpoides Müll. Arg.; Usnea dasypoga var. microcarpoides (Müll. Arg.) Zahlbr.; Usnea microcarpoides (Müll. Arg.) Motyka

= Pyrenula microcarpa =

Species of lichen

Pyrenula microcarpa is a species of corticolous (bark-dwelling), crustose lichen in the family Pyrenulaceae. It has a pantropical distribution.

== Description ==
Pyrenula microcarpa has a white to grey thallus without a pseudocyphellae, and black ascomata measuring up to 0.7 mm (0.028 in) in diameter.

== Taxonomy ==
The lichen was formally described as a new species in 1885 by Johannes Müller Argoviensis.

== Distribution ==
The species is primarily pantropical, mostly found in open coastal areas, but can also be found in montane forest. It is widespread in Australia, and was first recognised in New Zealand in 2015.

== See also ==
- List of Pyrenula species
