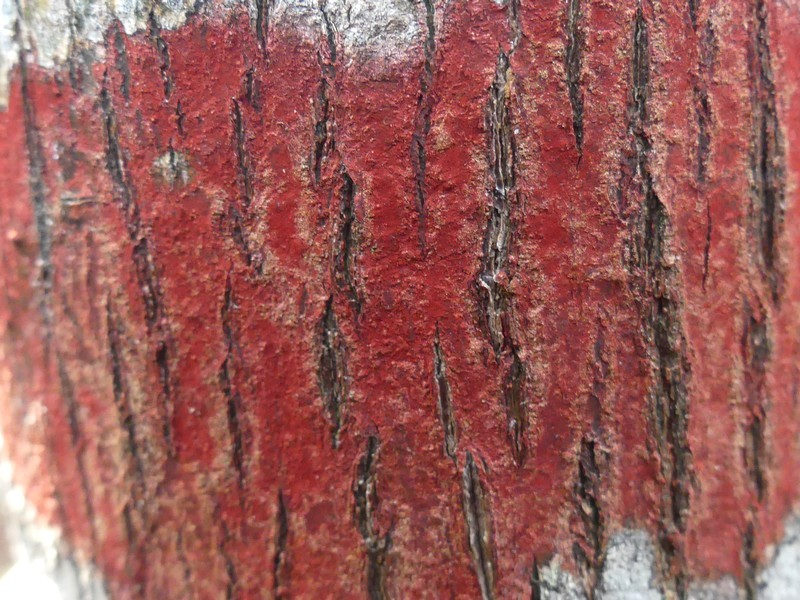
- in Cuba

Conservation status
- Apparently Secure (NatureServe)

Scientific classification
- Kingdom: Fungi
- Division: Ascomycota
- Class: Eurotiomycetes
- Order: Pyrenulales
- Family: Pyrenulaceae
- Genus: Pyrenula
- Species: P. cruentata

Binomial name
- Pyrenula cruentata (Müll.Arg.) R.C.Harris (1987)

Synonyms
- Bottaria cruentata Müll.Arg. (1885)

= Pyrenula cruentata =

Species of lichen

Pyrenula cruentata is a species of corticolous (bark-dwelling), crustose lichen in the family Pyrenulaceae. The lichen, characterized by its crimson-colored thallus and perithecial warts, has a neotropical distribution.

The lichen was first formally described in 1885 by Swiss botanist Johannes Müller Argoviensis as Bottaria cruentata. Richard Harris transferred it to the genus Pyrenula in 1987.

In northern North America, where its distribution in the United States is limited to southern Florida, it is commonly known as the bark rash lichen. It occurs on the bark of hardwood trees in hammocks and woodlands.

== See also ==
- List of Pyrenula species
