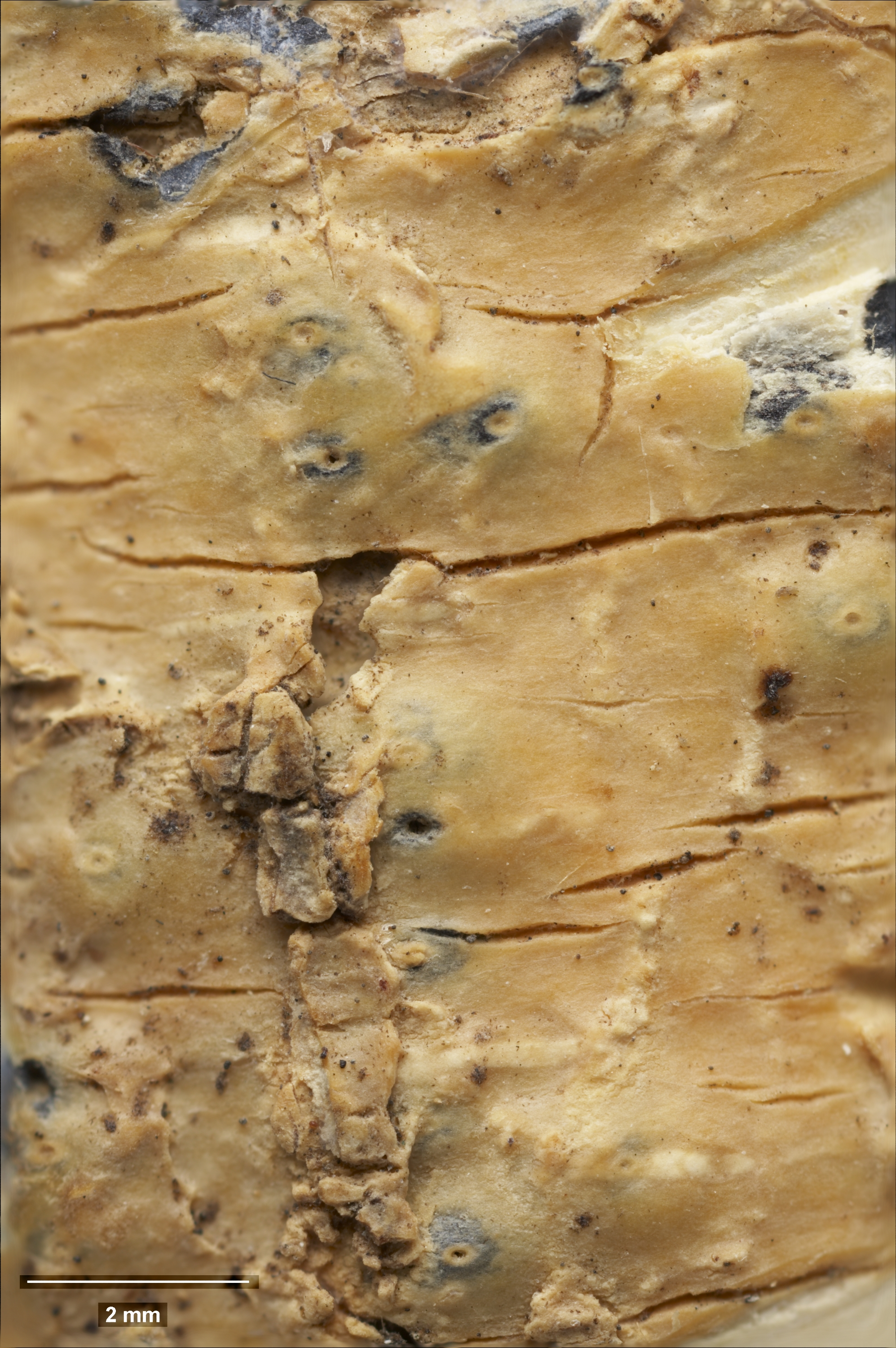
- Herbarium specimen from Te Papa, collected from Enoggera Creek, Brisbane

Scientific classification
- Kingdom: Fungi
- Division: Ascomycota
- Class: Eurotiomycetes
- Order: Pyrenulales
- Family: Pyrenulaceae
- Genus: Pyrenula
- Species: P. subvariolosa

Binomial name
- Pyrenula subvariolosa (C. Knight) Aptroot

Synonyms
- Synonymy: Anthracothecium subvariolosum (C.Knight) C.Knight ex Shirley; Bottaria umbilicata (C.Knight) Müll.Arg.; Parmentaria plana (C.Knight) Shirley; Parmentaria umbilicata (C.Knight) Shirley; Trypethelium planum C.Knight; Trypethelium umbilicatum C.Knight; Verrucaria subvariolosa C.Knight

= Pyrenula subvariolosa =

Species of lichen

Pyrenula subvariolosa is a species of corticolous (bark-dwelling), crustose lichen in the family Pyrenulaceae. Previously thought to be endemic to Australia, it was found in New Zealand in 2016.

== Description ==
Pyrenula pyrenuloides has a yellow to olive green thallus without a pseudocyphellae, and solitary black ascomata. It can be differentiated from other species by to the solitary ascomata, irregularly submuriform ascospores that have simple end locules, and a minimal number of longitudinally septate medial sells.

== Taxonomy ==
The lichen was formally described as a new species by New Zealand doctor Charles Knight in 1886, who used the name Verrucaria subvariolosa. The species was recombined in 2007 by André Aptroot, who placed it in the genus Pyrenula.

== Distribution and habitat ==
The species is found in Australian rainforests in eastern Queensland, New South Wales and Tasmania, and was first recognised in New Zealand in 2016, when it was collected from Smith's Bush in Auckland. In New Zealand, the species typically grows on Pseudopanax crassifolius and Myrsine australis.

== See also ==
- List of Pyrenula species
