= Pyrenula montocensis =

Scientific classification
- Kingdom: Fungi
- Division: Ascomycota
- Class: Eurotiomycetes
- Order: Pyrenulales
- Family: Pyrenulaceae
- Genus: Pyrenula
- Species: P. montocensis

Binomial name
- Pyrenula montocensis Lücking (2008)

Species of lichen-forming fungus

Pyrenula montocensis is a species of corticolous (bark-dwelling), crustose lichen in the family Pyrenulaceae. It forms a thick yellow to olive-green crust on tree bark, with many tiny surface pores and crystal-like bumps around its fruiting bodies. The fruiting bodies appear as small, rounded bumps that are partly embedded in the crust, and the species can be confirmed under the microscope by its exceptionally large ascospores divided by three internal walls. It was known only from a single collection made near San José in 1929, and the original description suggested it may have disappeared from the now-urban type locality. It has since been recorded in Colombia.

== Taxonomy ==
It was described as a new species in 2008 by the lichenologist Robert Lücking, based on a specimen collected on 4 October 1929 from San Pedro de Montes de Oca, near San José in Costa Rica.

== Description ==
The lichen forms a thick, thallus (the main lichen body) with a cortex that is yellow to olive green. The surface is marked by pseudocyphellae (small breaks that look like pores) and by abundant crystalline papillae (tiny, crystal-coated bumps), which are often most conspicuous around the fruiting bodies. Its perithecia (flask-shaped fruiting bodies) are solitary and hemispherical, ranging from immersed in the substrate to partly erupting, and measure about 0.5–1 mm across; the basal portion is covered by thallus tissue. The perithecial wall contains crystals and can be up to about 200 μm thick, while the apical ostiole (opening) is brown to black.

Under the microscope, the hamathecium (tissue between the asci) has no oil droplets and turns orange when treated with iodine (IKI+ orange); its filaments are unbranched. Each ascus contains eight gray-brown ascospores arranged in two uneven rows. The spores are 3-septate and fusiform with rounded ends, measuring about 75–90 × 25–30 μm. Their internal compartments (lumina) are somewhat rounded and are separated from the outer wall by a thick internal layer. No lichen products were detected in the thallus.

== Habitat and distribution ==
In its original description, P. montocensis was distinguished within Pyrenula by its exceptionally large 3-septate ascospores, reported as the largest of that spore type then known in the genus. Spores of comparable length occur in Pyrenula subpraelucida (to about 80 μm), but that species differs in spore structure and in lacking both pseudocyphellae and crystalline papillae; its perithecia are also more prominent and often more extensively covered by thallus. Lücking considered Pyrenula laii the closest relative, but that species has smaller ascospores (aside from reports of an allied taxon approaching 80 μm) and does not develop the distinctive crystalline papillae of P. montocensis. The type locality is now within the urban area of San José and adjacent suburbs (around the University of Costa Rica), and the author suggested the species may now be extinct there. The lichen was recorded from Colombia in 2024.

== See also ==
- List of Pyrenula species
