= Pyrenula supralaetior =

Scientific classification
- Kingdom: Fungi
- Division: Ascomycota
- Class: Eurotiomycetes
- Order: Pyrenulales
- Family: Pyrenulaceae
- Genus: Pyrenula
- Species: P. supralaetior

Binomial name
- Pyrenula supralaetior C.O.Mendonça, Aptroot & M.Cáceres (2016)
- Type locality: Mata dos Coqueiros, Bahia, Brazil

Species of lichen-forming fungus

Pyrenula supralaetior is a crustose (crust-forming), bark-dwelling lichen in the family Pyrenulaceae. It was described as new in 2016 from specimens collected in Bahia, Brazil.

The thallus of P. supralaetior is thin, yellowish brown and slightly mottled, with a smooth, shiny, corticate surface; it has pseudocyphellae (tiny pores in the surface) but lacks both red pruina (a surface "dusting") and a visible border zone (prothallus). The algal partner (photobiont) is a trentepohlioid green alga. Its fruiting bodies (perithecia) are partly sunken in the thallus (erumpent) to prominent, somewhat globose to low-conical with a rounded tip, and about 0.4–0.6 mm across. The apical, black pore-like openings (ostioles) are flat to slightly depressed and lack pruina in the canal. The sterile tissue inside (hamathecium) is filled with oil droplets (inspersed). The asci contain eight ascospores in a single row (uniseriate). The brown spores are 3-septate and measure 25–31 × 11–13 μm. They are distoseptate, with rounded to diamond-shaped internal spaces (lumina), rounded ends, and no gelatinous sheath or ornamentation. Pycnidia (asexual fruiting bodies) were not observed. Chemical spot tests were negative (K−, UV−), and thin-layer chromatography detected no lichen substances.

The species is known from primary forest, where it grows on smooth bark of trees and branches. The type was collected in the Chapada Diamantina region (Mata dos Coqueiros, near Abaíra) at about 916 m (3,005 ft) elevation, in a brejo de altitude (a humid, forested enclave at higher elevations). In the original description, P. supralaetior was compared with Pyrenula laetior, from which it was distinguished by its larger ascospores. As of 2025, it had not been recorded from any other Brazilian states.

== See also ==
- List of Pyrenula species
