= Pyrenula sanguineostiolata =

Scientific classification
- Kingdom: Fungi
- Division: Ascomycota
- Class: Eurotiomycetes
- Order: Pyrenulales
- Family: Pyrenulaceae
- Genus: Pyrenula
- Species: P. sanguineostiolata

Binomial name
- Pyrenula sanguineostiolata Aptroot & Merc.-Díaz (2018)
- Holotype: Maricao, Puerto Rico

Species of lichen

Pyrenula sanguineostiolata is a species of corticolous (bark-dwelling) crustose lichen in the family Pyrenulaceae. Found in Puerto Rico, it was formally described as a new species in 2018 by André Aptroot and Joel Alejandro Mercado Diaz.

== Taxonomy ==
Pyrenula sanguineostiolata was formally described in 2018 by André Aptroot and Joel Mercado-Díaz, based on collections from Puerto Rico. It is taxonomically remarkable for having a vivid red ostiole, a rare feature within the genus. While other Pyrenula species may have pigmented tissues, P. sanguineostiolata is the first known to combine a brightly red ostiole with deeply immersed ascomata.

== Description ==
This corticolous crustose lichen forms a thin, continuous thallus up to 0.1 mm thick. The thallus is smooth and olivaceous green, lacking pseudocyphellae or pockets of crystals. Its photobiont partner is a green alga of the genus Trentepohlia.

The ascomata are perithecioid—flask-like fruiting structures that are simple and scattered. They are pyriform (pear-shaped), deeply immersed in the bark tissue, and measure 0.3–0.5 mm in diameter. Only the ostioles are visible from above; these are strikingly bright red and about 0.1 mm wide. The ascomatal wall is evenly carbonised, about 40 μm thick, and lacks any crystalline inclusions.

Internally, the hamathecium (the network of sterile filaments within the ascoma) is hyaline (transparent) and uninspersed. The asci are club-shaped and contain eight ascospores arranged irregularly. Ascospores are brown, 3-septate, and broadly fusiform (spindle-shaped) with pointed ends. They measure 25–28 × 9–12 μm. The internal lumina are rounded to diamond-shaped, sometimes irregularly arranged, with terminal lumina distinctly separated from the outer spore wall by a layer of endospore. No asexual reproductive structures were observed.

Chemically, the red ostiolar pigment is an anthraquinone that reacts positively to both ultraviolet light (UV+ red) and potassium hydroxide (KOH+ dark purple, nearly black), indicating a distinctive compound not commonly found in the genus.

== Habitat and distribution ==
This species has been recorded only from its type locality in the submontane evergreen wet forests of Puerto Rico, specifically in the Maricao State Forest at roughly 850 metres elevation. It was found growing on tree bark in humid, forested conditions.

== See also ==
- List of Pyrenula species
