= Pyrenula endocrocea =

Scientific classification
- Kingdom: Fungi
- Division: Ascomycota
- Class: Eurotiomycetes
- Order: Pyrenulales
- Family: Pyrenulaceae
- Genus: Pyrenula
- Species: P. endocrocea

Binomial name
- Pyrenula endocrocea Aptroot (2012)
- Holotype: Burnham Park, Philippines

Species of lichen

Pyrenula endocrocea is a little-known species of corticolous (bark-dwelling) crustose lichen in the family Pyrenulaceae. Its characteristic feature is a soft layer of orange-coloured anthraquinone crystals in its medulla.

== Taxonomy ==
The lichen was formally described as a new species in 2012 by the Dutch lichenologist André Aptroot. It is only known from the type specimen, which was collected by Aptroot in 1987 from Burnham Park in Baguio at an elevation of 1,300 m (4,300 ft); there, it was found growing on the bark of Japanese alder (Alnus japonica). Aptroot had referred to the species in a publication earlier in the year (a world key to Anthracothecium and Pyrenula) as ined., or unpublished.

== Description ==
Pyrenula endocrocea has a smooth, corticate, continuous thallus that is relatively thick and brownish in colour. It does not have pseudocyphellae. Notably, the medulla contains an abundant layer of orange anthraquinone crystals, which display distinctive chemical reactions, turning red under ultraviolet (UV+) and crimson with potassium hydroxide (K+). Its algal partner belongs to the trentepohlioid group.

The ascomata (fruiting bodies) of this species are perithecioid in form, simple, and dispersed across the thallus surface. They are conical and emergent, ranging from 0.3 to 0.6 mm in diameter. These black fruiting structures are covered at their edges by a thick layer of the thallus. The ascomatal wall is about 200 μm thick and uniformly carbonized, showing no reaction to KOH (K–).

The ostioles, situated at the apex of the ascomata, are brown and similarly unreactive to KOH. Internally, the hamathecium is transparent and densely filled with oil droplets. The asci are cylindrico-clavate and contain eight irregularly arranged ascospores. They show no staining reaction with iodine.

Ascospores are brown and initially divided by three septa, rapidly becoming muriform with 1–3 transverse septa and 4–8 rows of lumina, each row containing between one and four compartments. Fusiform in shape, these spores usually have a central constriction. They measure about 32–44 μm long and 13–16 μm wide, with rounded ends and predominantly rounded lumina. In postmature spores, a distinctive red oil can often be observed. No pycnidia have been observed in this species. Chemically, the presence of anthraquinone in the medulla is confirmed by reactions turning UV light red and potassium hydroxide crimson.

== See also ==
- List of Pyrenula species
