= Pyrenula rubrojavanica =

Scientific classification
- Domain: Eukaryota
- Kingdom: Fungi
- Division: Ascomycota
- Class: Eurotiomycetes
- Order: Pyrenulales
- Family: Pyrenulaceae
- Genus: Pyrenula
- Species: P. rubrojavanica

Binomial name
- Pyrenula rubrojavanica Aptroot (2012)

Species of lichen

Pyrenula rubrojavanica is a rare species of corticolous (bark-dwelling) crustose lichen in the family Pyrenulaceae. The type specimen was collected by Pieter Groenhart around 1959 in Indonesia, from West Java near Bogor, at Camp Kedung Badak. It was found growing on the bark of Camellia sinensis at an elevation of about 700 m (2,300 ft). It is known only from its type specimen. Aptroot had referred to the species in a publication earlier in the year (a world key to Anthracothecium and Pyrenula) as ined., or unpublished.

== Description ==
Pyrenula rubrojavanica is characterized by a smooth, relatively thick thallus protected by a cortical outer layer. The thallus has a distinctive dark reddish to orange-brown colour and produces a distinctive crimson reaction when exposed to potassium hydroxide (KOH) solution. Unlike some lichens, Pyrenula rubrojavanica lacks specialized pores (pseudocyphellae) and embedded crystals. It forms a symbiotic partnership with trentepohlioid algae, which provide nourishment through photosynthesis.

The ascomata (fruiting bodies) are small, hemispherical, black fruiting bodies about 0.4–0.7 mm in diameter. They protrude slightly from the thallus and often have a thin covering layer of the thallus itself. Their walls are darkened and sometimes merge with adjacent ascomata. The spores (ascospores) contained within are brown, spindle-shaped, and typically divided into four compartments. Chemically, the striking colouration is attributed to orange-red anthraquinone compounds, confirmed by their crimson reaction with KOH.

== See also ==
- List of Pyrenula species
