= Pyrenula multicolorata =

Scientific classification
- Domain: Eukaryota
- Kingdom: Fungi
- Division: Ascomycota
- Class: Eurotiomycetes
- Order: Pyrenulales
- Family: Pyrenulaceae
- Genus: Pyrenula
- Species: P. multicolorata

Binomial name
- Pyrenula multicolorata Weerakoon & Aptroot (2016)

Species of lichen

Pyrenula multicolorata is a species of corticolous (bark-dwelling), crustose lichen in the family Pyrenulaceae, first described in 2016. It is distinguished by its almost superficial ascomata with a hamathecium inspersed with orange crystals, and ascospores that contain three internal partitions (septa).

== Taxonomy ==
Pyrenula multicolorata was formally described by lichenologists Gothamie Weerakoon and André Aptroot in 2016. The type specimen was collected in Kitulgala-Makandawa, Sri Lanka, on the bark of a tree on 29 March 2015.

== Description ==
The thallus of Pyrenula multicolorata is oily, olive green, and quite thick, covering areas up to 5 cm (2 in) in diameter, and surrounded by a thin black hypothallus line. Ascomata are almost superficial, low conical, black, and not covered by the thallus, measuring 0.5–0.7 mm in diameter. The ostiole is apical, brown to black. The hamathecium is inspersed with many orange crystals that colour the hamathecium red close to the wall and yellow in the center. Ascospores number eight per ascus, pale brown (dark brown only when postmature), irregularly biseriate, 3-septate, measuring 12–13.5 by 4.5–5.5 μm, with lumina becoming diamond-shaped, and a relatively thick wall with a thick layer of endospore in the spore tips. Pycnidia were not observed to occur in this species.

== Chemistry ==
The thallus of Pyrenula multicolorata is UV− and K−. The hamathecium contains an orange to red or yellow (depending on dilution), KOH-negative substance. Thin-layer chromatography analysis did not detect any substances.

== Distribution and habitat ==
This species is found on trees in wet lowland tropical rainforests and at the time of its publication was known only from Sri Lanka.
