= Palo Verde =

Palo Verde or palo verde may refer to:

== Arts, entertainment, and media ==
- "Palo Verde", a song by The Fireman from the album Rushes (1998)

== Biology ==
- Palo verde beetle, a species of longhorn beetle
- Parkinsonia, a genus of perennial flowering plants, commonly known as palo verde

== Buildings ==
=== Schools ===
- Palo Verde College in Blythe, California, United States
- Palo Verde High School in Las Vegas, Nevada, United States
- Palo Verde High School (Arizona) in Tucson, Arizona, United States
- Palo Verde Christian High School in Tucson, Arizona, United States

=== Other buildings ===
- Palo Verde Hospital in Blythe, California, United States
- Palo Verde Nuclear Generating Station in Wintersburg, Arizona, United States
- Palo Verde Biological Station in Palo Verde National Park, Costa Rica
- Palo Verde station, a rapid transit station in Caracas, Venezuela

== Cities and towns ==
- Palo Verde, Arizona, United States
- Palo Verde, California, United States
- Palo Verde, Monte Cristi Province, Dominican Republic
- Palo Verde, Jalapa, Guatemala
- Palo Verde, Caracas, Venezuela
- Canton Palo Verde, Sonsonate, El Salvador

== Natural features ==
- Palo Verde Mountains, California, United States
- Palo Verde National Park, Costa Rica
- Palo Verde Valley, United States

== See also ==
- Paloverde (disambiguation)
- Palos Verdes Peninsula
- Palos Verdes Hills
