= Pyrenula coccinea =

Scientific classification
- Kingdom: Fungi
- Division: Ascomycota
- Class: Eurotiomycetes
- Order: Pyrenulales
- Family: Pyrenulaceae
- Genus: Pyrenula
- Species: P. coccinea

Binomial name
- Pyrenula coccinea C.O.Mendonça, Aptroot & M.Cáceres (2016)
- Type locality: Povoado Ouro Verde, Bahia, Brazil

Species of lichen-forming fungus

Pyrenula coccinea is a crustose (crust-forming), bark-dwelling lichen in the family Pyrenulaceae. It was described as new in 2016 from specimens collected in northeastern Brazil (Bahia).

It forms a thin, yellowish-brown, somewhat shiny thallus that lacks pseudocyphellae and a visible border zone (prothallus). The algal partner (photobiont) is a trentepohlioid green alga. Its fruiting bodies (perithecia) are partly sunken to prominent, pear-shaped, and about 0.4–0.5 mm across, with 6–25 perithecia grouped within a swollen tissue mass (pseudostroma) that has partly fused outer walls but separate, apical pore-like openings (ostioles). The ostioles are coated with a red dusting (pruina), while the thallus itself lacks red pruina. The sterile tissue inside the fruiting body (hamathecium) is not filled with oil droplets (not inspersed). The asci contain eight ascospores arranged in a single row. The brown spores are divided into 4 cells by 3 septa and measure about 15–18(–20) × 5–6 μm.The spores are distoseptate, with terminal lumina that do not directly contact the outer wall, and they lack surface ornamentation. Pycnidia (asexual fruiting bodies) were not observed. The pseudostroma surface gives a purple reaction with potassium hydroxide solution (the K spot test), is UV−, and thin-layer chromatography detected an unidentified anthraquinone.

The species is known from primary forest in Bahia, where it grows on smooth bark of trees and branches. The type was collected in the Chapada Diamantina region near Povoado Ouro Verde–Catolé at about 1,636 m (5,367 ft) elevation. As of 2025, it had not been reported from any other Brazilian states. In the original description, the authors compared P. coccinea with Pyrenula rubroanomala, separating it by its non-pruinose thallus, the absence of a prothallus, and differences in ascospore variation. The holotype is housed in the herbarium of the State University of Feira de Santana in Bahia (specimen ISE 23938).

== See also ==
- List of Pyrenula species
