= Pyrenula rubromarginata =

Scientific classification
- Kingdom: Fungi
- Division: Ascomycota
- Class: Eurotiomycetes
- Order: Pyrenulales
- Family: Pyrenulaceae
- Genus: Pyrenula
- Species: P. rubromarginata

Binomial name
- Pyrenula rubromarginata Sipman (2023)
- Holotype: Kuyuwini Landing, Upper Takutu-Upper Essequibo Region, Guyana

Species of lichen

Pyrenula rubromarginata is a species of corticolous (bark-dwelling) crustose lichen in the family Pyrenulaceae. It is distinguished by a red pigment that forms a border around the small black fruiting bodies. The species is known only from a single tree in undisturbed lowland forest in southern Guyana.

== Taxonomy ==
Pyrenula rubromarginata was described as new in 2023 by Harrie Sipman. The holotype was collected in southern Guyana near Kuyuwini Landing, in the Upper Takutu-Upper Essequibo Region (Region 9), on the trunk of a Hymenaea courbaril tree in seasonally dry, undisturbed lowland forest. The species epithet refers to the striking red pigment that borders the fruiting bodies.

Sipman distinguished P. rubromarginata from other red-pigmented Pyrenula that lack thallus pigmentation by its combination of scattered to slightly aggregated conical perithecia (the tiny, flask-like fruiting bodies) and small, 3-septate spores arranged in a single row (uniseriate) with relatively thick end cells. He compared it most closely with P. howeana, which has slightly larger spores with thin terminal walls and oil droplets in the internal tissue (a guttulate hamathecium), and with P. rubroanomala, which bears clustered perithecia fused into conspicuous pseudostromata and has somewhat narrower spores.

== Description ==
It is a bark-dwelling lichen with a thin, pale ocher-brown thallus embedded in the outer bark (endoperidermal). The surface is smooth and does not fluoresce under ultraviolet light (UV–), sometimes with a little red pigment near the fruiting bodies. Perithecia are simple, black, low-conical to nearly hemispherical, about 0.5–0.6 mm wide, and sit directly on the surface (sessile). Each has a hard, carbonized wall (exciple) about 75 μm thick that is covered by a thin, non-carbonized red-pigmented layer; the pore at the top (ostiole) is flat and about 0.1 mm wide. The internal tissue between the spore sacs (hamathecium) is clear. Asci (spore sacs) are cylindrical (roughly 75 × 13 μm) and may show a small ocular chamber when young. Ascospores number eight per ascus, in a single row, gray-brown, broadly spindle-shaped, and 3-septate, about 13–15 × 6 μm. Their internal cavities (lumina) are lens-shaped; the end cells are set off from the spore tips by an inner wall layer (endospore). Old spores turn brown and shrivel. Early spore stages are thin-walled and colorless; a median septum forms first and thickens, followed by the lateral septa. Spores then pass through gray to pale gray-brown stages; black lines indicating "true" septa (eusepta) may appear, and over-mature spores become dark brown and shrivel. This pattern matches Sipman's "type 1" development.

The chemistry is dominated by an unidentified red pigment restricted to the margin of the perithecia. In microscopic mounts the exciple turns violet with K and the red pigment dissolves into a transient colored cloud; the material was too scant to study by thin-layer chromatography.

== Habitat and distribution ==
As of its original publication, the species was known only from the type locality, where it was collected in the crown of a mature tree in semideciduous, approximately 30-m-tall lowland forest in southern Guyana.

== See also ==
- List of Pyrenula species
