= Deborah Clark =

Deborah A. Clark is a Research and adjunct professor of Tropical Ecology at the University of Missouri-St. Louis. For over 40 years she has worked with her partner David B. Clark on the zoology, botany, geosciences, ecology, and climatology of the rain forests in Costa Rica.

== Personal life ==
Deborah A. Clark met her long-time collaborator and husband David B. Clark on their first day of college at the University of North Carolina in 1966. They have been married since 1970.

== Education ==
Clark graduated from the University of North Carolina in 1970 with a B.A. in biology. She then went on to the University of Wisconsin, where she completed a Ph.D. in zoology with a minor in botany in 1978.

== Professional work ==
In 1978 Clark accepted a position with the Point Reyes Bird Observatory in Stinson Beach, California. She left this position in 1979, when she and her husband became the first co-directors of the Organization for Tropical Studies's La Selva Biological Station. In addition to rapidly expanding the scope of research carried out at La Selva, they also establish some of the long-term studies on forest dynamics that continue to this day. During their tenure a 5 km concrete trail and mapped 100 m transects that facilitated research in the reserve were completed with grants from the U.S. National Science Foundation; they also marked and mapped hundreds of individuals of six different tree species.

The Clarks stepped as co-directors of La Selva in 1994 to conduct full-time research on tropical forest structure, life histories of tropical trees, and the effects of climate change. With funding from numerous source they implemented a 42-meter tower to measure atmospheric carbon as part a global array dedicated to studying climate change.
