= La Selva Biological Station =

Protected area in Costa Rica

- Location within Costa Rica
- Location: Heredia Province, Costa Rica
- Nearest city: Puerto Viejo de Sarapiquí
- Coordinates: 10°25′19″N 84°00′54″W
- Area: 15 km^{2} (5.8 sq mi)
- Established: 1953
- Governing body: National System of Conservation Areas (SINAC) and Organization for Tropical Studies (OTS)

La Selva Biological Station is a protected area encompassing 1,536 ha of low-land tropical rain forest in northeastern Costa Rica. It is owned and operated by the Organization for Tropical Studies, a consortium of universities and research institutions from the United States, Costa Rica, and Puerto Rico. Recognized internationally as one of the most productive field stations in the world for tropical forest research and peer-reviewed publications, La Selva hosts approximately 300 scientists and 100 university courses every year. The primary goal of La Selva Biological Station is to preserve and protect an intact forest, as well as providing laboratory facilities for tropical research and education. The research potential of the area is not only vital to tropical ecology, but it is also an important location in the effort to study relations between local communities and protected areas. In addition, its high diversity and ease of access to the Puerto Viejo-Horquetas highway makes La Selva an important ecotourism destination and environmental education center for tourists and the local community.

== History ==
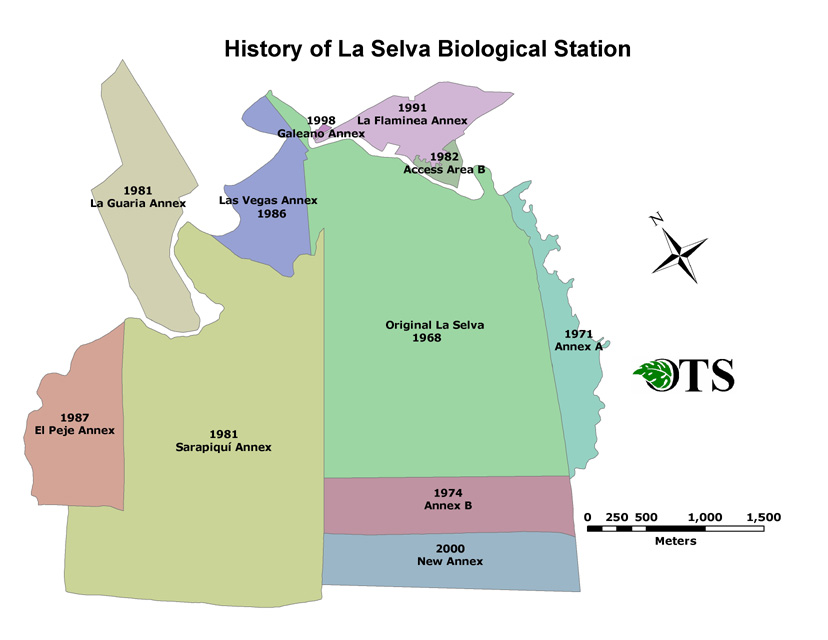
Land Acquisition History of La Selva Biological Station, Costa Rica

Leslie Holdridge established La Selva in 1953. Holdridge was an American botanist and climatologist who is known for his widely used classification system of land areas called The Holdridge Life Zones System. He originally purchased the land to use as a farm for experimenting with mixed agriculture, and was especially interested in experimenting with tree crops that could be planted without total clearing of the native forest. In the beginning, La Selva was a challenge to get to; the trip required a long, treacherous dirt road followed by a 4-kilometer dugout canoe trip. In 1968 the Organization of Tropical Studies (OTS) bought the area for fifty thousand US dollars to be used as a private reserve and biological station. OTS was a small, 5-year-old organization created with the goal of facilitating research and education in the tropics. Holdridge encouraged OTS to use La Selva as a research site even before it became OTS property. Holdridge supported research at La Selva until his death in 1999. Since the station's beginnings in 1953, there have been immense changes: access is easy, buildings have been constructed, and the preserve has tripled in size. It is now one of the most important sites for tropical research in the world. In the past few decades, however, the human population around the Station have increased rapidly due to several factors, including the expansion of banana production and government settlement projects.

== Location ==
La Selva Biological Station is located in the Central Conservation Area (91,000 ha) in the north-eastern lowlands of Costa Rica (10°26´ N, 83°59´ W). It encompasses 1,536 ha of classic-lowland tropical rain forest. The Sarapiquí and Puerto Viejo Rivers border the Station to the north, the Peje River to the west, and the Sábalo-Esquina creeks to the east. Braulio Carrillo National Park (47,000 ha) is adjacent to the southern border of the Station and is connected via a 4–6 km wide protected corridor. The closest communities to the Station are La Flamínea (at its north-eastern border) and El Tigre (7 km south-east). Each of these communities has approximately 500 residents and they were established as recently as 1985. Puerto Viejo, the capital of the Cantón Sarapiquí in the province of Heredia, is the nearest major town, with approximately 1,163 residents, and is located seven kilometers north-east of La Selva. La Selva Biological Station is only 2 hours by car from San José airport.

== Environment ==
Of the total La Selva property (1,536 ha), 55% is characterized as species-rich, multilayered communities of primary forest. These forests contain impressive trees, lianas, epiphytes, palms, and many other broad-leaved monocots. The remaining areas of the reserve consist of abandoned pastures and plantations in various stages of succession, selectively logged secondary forest, or plots designated for experimental use. The reserve is located at the physiographic transition from the low, steep foothills of the Central Volcanic Cordillera to the vast Caribbean coastal plain in northeastern Costa Rica. At the northern end of the property the elevation is about 35 meters above sea level, but it quickly gives way to steep hills that reach up to 137 meters elevation at the southwest corner. The altitudinal transect connecting La Selva Biological Station to the main body of Braulio Carrillo National Park (approximately 55 km) extends from La Selva to Barva Volcano and includes tropical wet, premontane rain, lower montane rain, and montane rain forest ecosystems. Located at the confluence of the Puerto Viejo and Sarapiquí Rivers, which meet at the station's northern border, the preserve is surrounded on three sides by the natural barriers created by these rivers and their tributaries. The soils along the rivers are composed of Holocene and Pleistocene alluvia and consist primarily of inceptisols with occasional entisols. La Selva's uplands, on the other hand, begin several hundred meters inland from the two rivers and are composed primarily of utisols.

Temperature variation is slight year round, and daily temperatures can fluctuate from 19 to 31 °C (66 to 88 °F). As the climate is tropical wet, rain is common throughout the year, and the average annual rainfall is 4 meters (13 feet). The rainiest months are July, November, and December, while the least rainy season is from February to April. The dry season is rarely long or severe.

== Flora and fauna ==
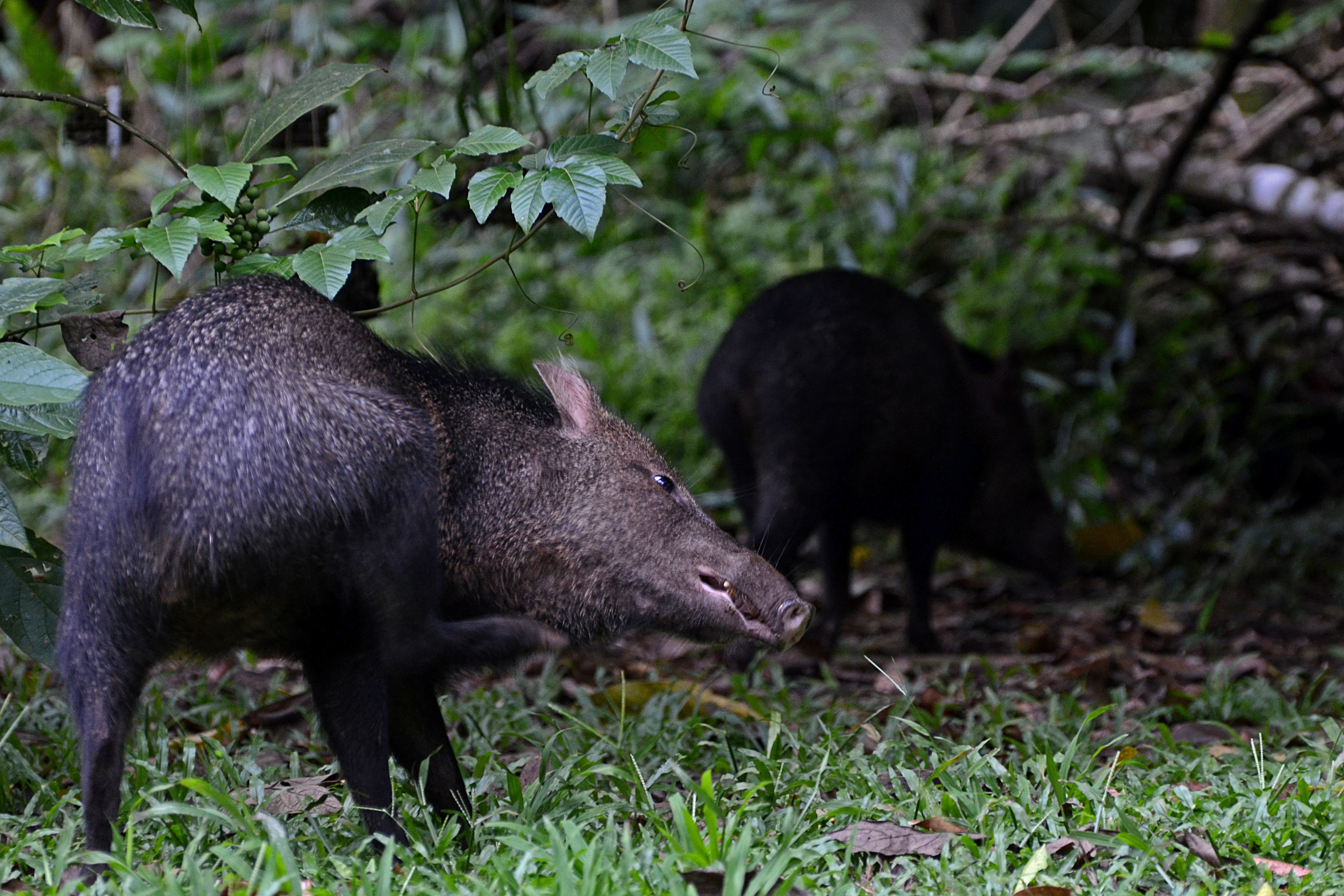
Tayassu tajacu in La Selva

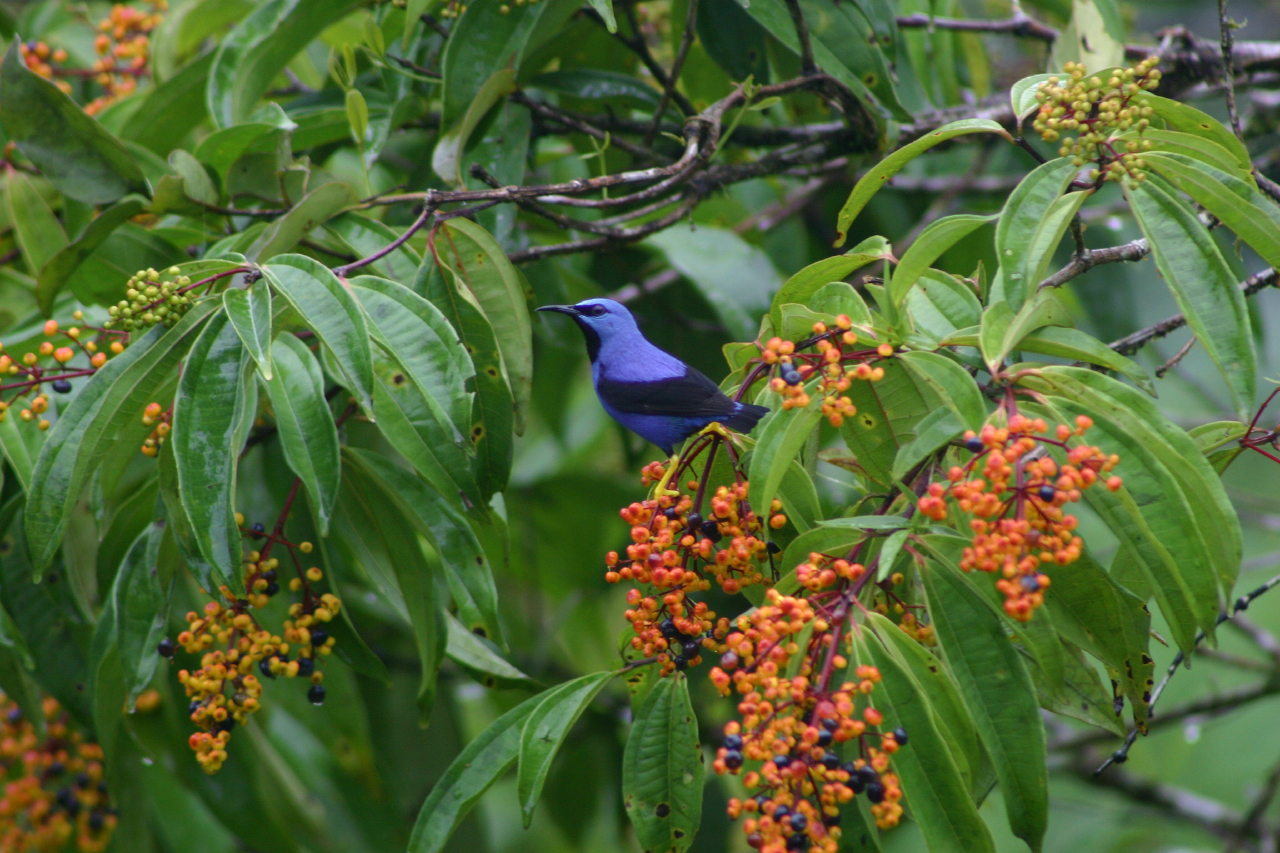
Perched Cyanerpes lucidus

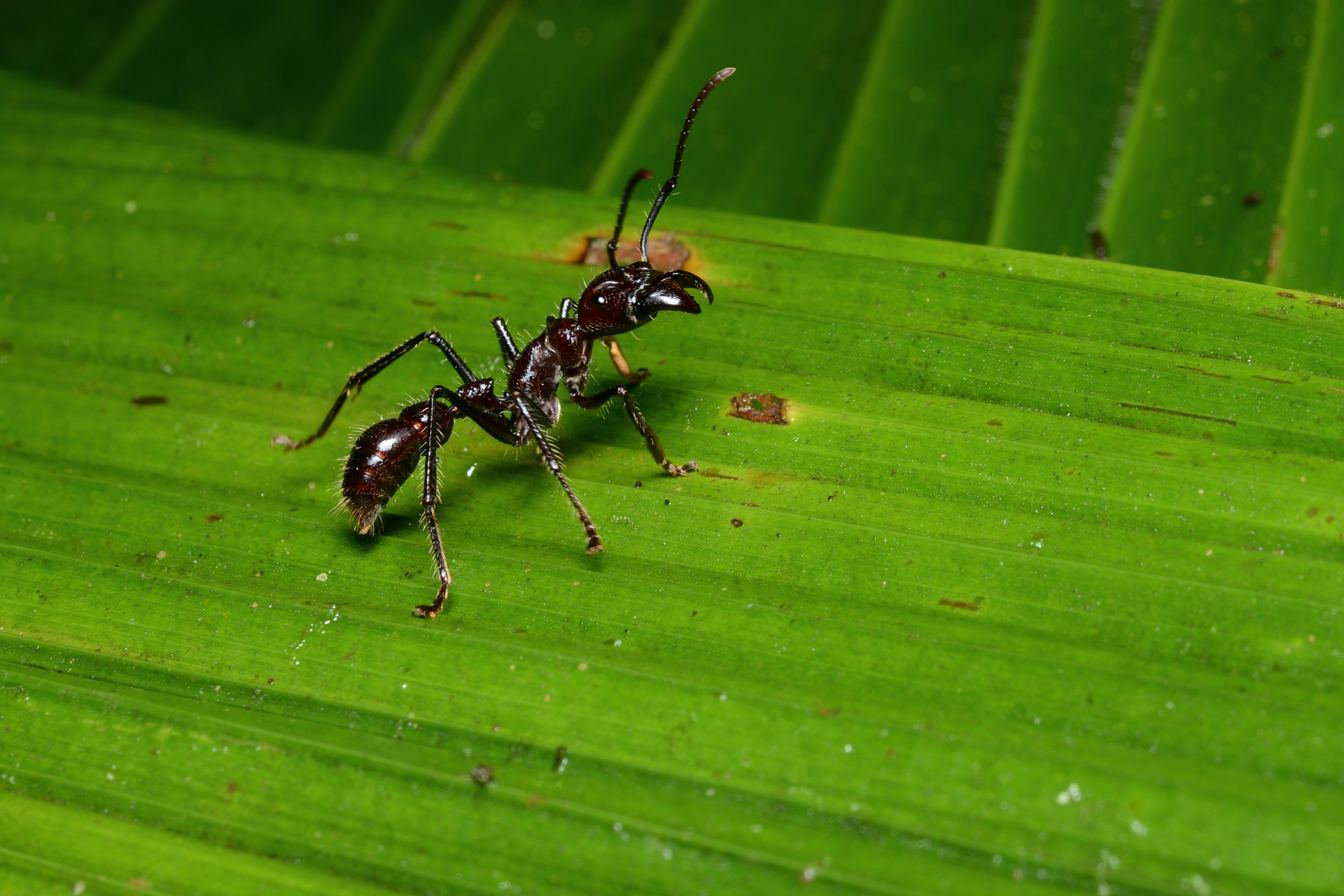
Paraponera clavata in La Selva

La Selva's biological resources are rich and largely intact which generates high biological diversity and productivity. The reserve is home to a wide range of wildlife, including large predators, rare birds, and an astonishing number of invertebrates. It is estimated that La Selva contains over 500,000 species, with more than half (about 300,000) consisting of insect species.

=== Plants ===
Four major tropical life zones are protected between the La Selva and its connection to Braulio Carrillo National Park. Within this reserve, more than 5,000 species of vascular plants can be found, of which more than 700 species are trees. La Selva hosts a large variety of epiphytes, epiphylls, and many climbing aroids. Other common tree species include Welfia regia, Socratea exorrhiza, and most notably Pentaclethra macroloba, which occur in an unusual abundance.

=== Mammals ===
There are many mammalian species including large predators such as jaguars (Jaguar) and pumas (Puma (genus)). According to the OTS Website , five of the six species of felines in the country are found within the reserve. Some other species include the collared peccary (Tayassu tajacu) and Hoffmann's two-toed sloth (Choloepus hoffmanni).

=== Birds ===
The large number of bird species found here exceeds any other site in Central America. The most recent list published includes 467 species of birds. When taking into account the total number of species found one must understand that many are rare or may have been seen by mistake. Of these species, more than half breed locally, and many are altitudinal migrants or North American overwintering migrants.

Several ecological variables influence the vulnerability to habitat fragmentation, and other changes in the environment, in various groups of avifauna: diet, habitat, propensity to join mixed-species flocks, and nest type. Insectivorous birds are particularly sensitive to fragmentation, perhaps due to their dietary or foraging substrate specialization; forest under-story birds are most vulnerable to changes in their habitat; mixed-species flocks are especially sensitive to fragmentation as they typically roam over large areas; and certain nest types are more vulnerable to predation than others. According to Matlock and Hartshorn, the avifauna most sensitive to environmental changes, in general, are the mixed flocks of ant followers and under-story insectivores.

Along altitudinal gradients such as those observed in La Selva, species diversity and community composition of birds change rapidly. Elevational and latitudinal migrants, single and mixed flocks, threatened and endangered species, along with many other groups can be found in this area. Wide arrays of trophic groups are present, but the most common types are arboreal frugivores, arboreal frugivore/insectivores, foliage insectivores, and nectarivore/insectivores.

=== Other animals ===
La Selva's rivers contain an order of magnitude fewer species than the large, continental, Neotropical rivers such as the Amazon and Orinoco. Despite this notable difference, the two rivers and 13 streams flowing through La Selva support many species of Characidae, Poeciliidae, Cichlidae, and others. Large predators are also represented by the bushmaster Lachesis (genus). Despite the high diversity of plants and vertebrates, these numbers are dwarfed by its invertebrate fauna. Over 450 ant species have been collected at La Selva, with many still undescribed and there are more than 5,000 moth species (many undescribed).

A more complete species list can be found at the Organization for Tropical Studies site.

== Research ==
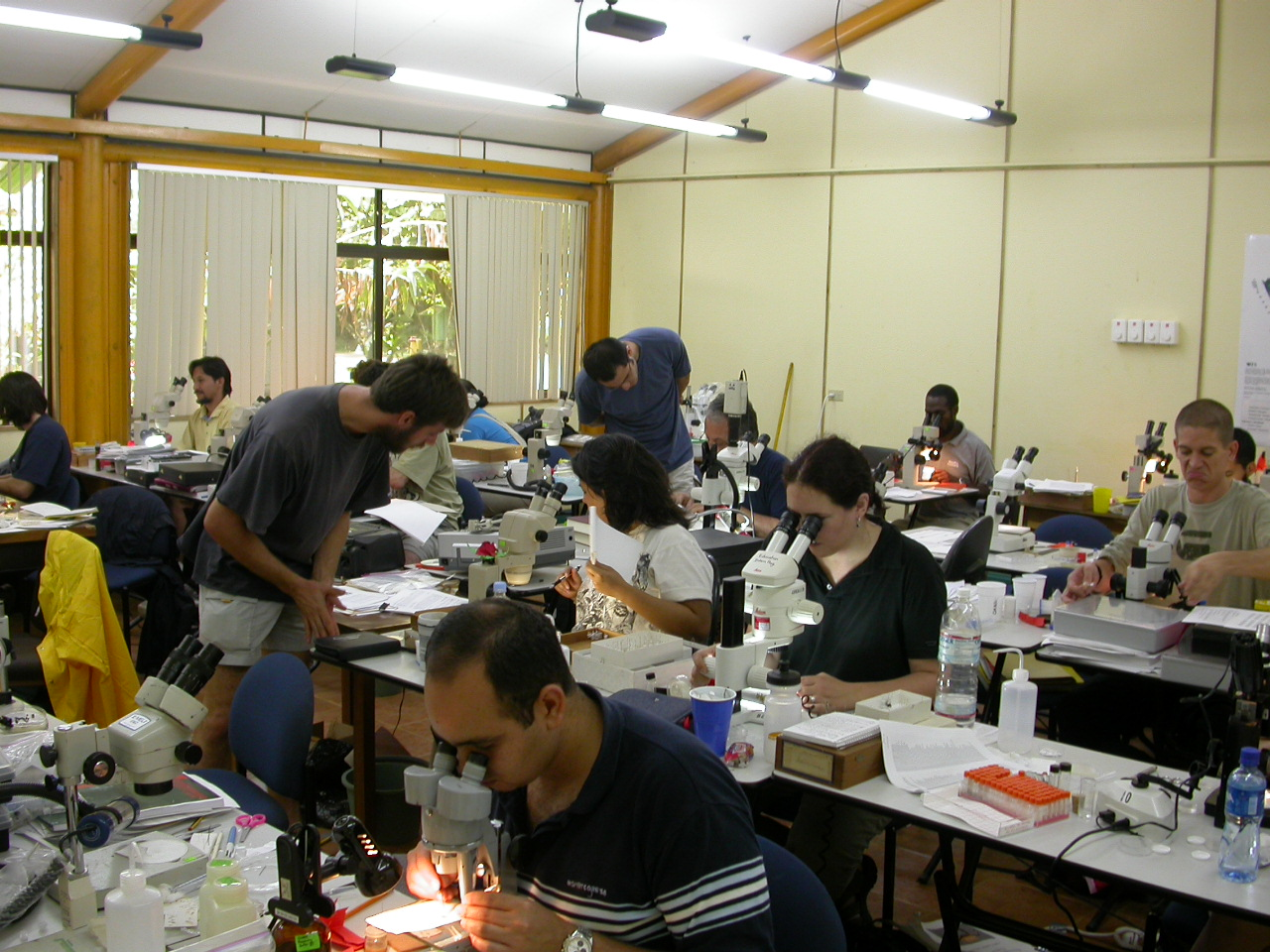
A photograph of one of the classrooms at La Selva being used for an Ant Course taught by Dr. Brian Fisher. Dr. Fisher is a renowned entomologist with a passion for ants. He specializes in the large-scale discovery, description and naming of ants. (https://web.archive.org/web/20101114085729/http://www.calacademy.org/science/heroes/bfisher/)

There is a great amount of research conducted at La Selva Biological Station. Each year, more than 240 papers are published from studies performed there. The station has grown and expanded its facilities to include two laboratories, workspaces, an academic center, a workers’ lounge, a researchers’ lounge, a river station, an herbarium, and of course, the surrounding reserve all for research purposes. Researchers can live on site at the station for anywhere between a few days to several months. To accommodate researchers there are cabin dormitories, family housing, a laundry room, a dining hall, and even a gift shop. Most of the tropical ecology research done by scientists at La Selva is related to one of these topics: interactions among interdependent species, carbon sequestration in forests, effects of climate change on ecosystems, mechanisms of speciation, food web dynamics, and maintenance of biodiversity Since there are many endangered species in tropical areas, a great amount of research is conducted on these species. Many researchers write papers analyzing data illustrating species’ decline, and often include thoughts on the conservation efforts needed to preserve them. And because humans are a major factor causing the endangerment of many of these species, mostly through habitat loss from human practices, there is extensive research done on impacts of humans in tropical forests. Research is done both on the effects of large companies conducting oil and mineral exploration, creating plantations, or cattle farming and also on local peoples who live in the forest and use its resources.

Examples of research projects conducted at La Selva:

- Army ants and their guests
- Comparison of eye size of bats
- Current and future carbon budgets for tropical rainforests
- Deforestation rates
- Root productivity in soil gradients
- Spider web cluster analysis
- The behavioral ecology of the mantled howler monkey
- Longitudinal studies of non-avian mammals

The TREES project was established by David Clark and Deborah Clark in 1983 when they were Directors of the Station. It ran until 2015 and provided an annual census of tropical tree performance and microsite condition.

== Threats ==
Due to La Selva's large area and the fact that many people are permanent residents living within the reserve, potential threats to the station and the surrounding area do exist. Wild habitats and habitat connectivity in the region are seriously threatened by deforestation and wetland loss. Solutions to habitat fragmentation and loss have been proposed by the Executive Committee that oversees the San Juan-La Selva Biological Corridor. A biological corridor would effectively bridge habitat gaps and allow species to migrate as normal Another potential threat to the reserve is illegal hunting within the reserve's land. Results of an oral questionnaire given to local residents of the reserve showed that 4% admitted to hunting within the year prior to the survey while 86% denied any hunting activity. 8% of respondents did not know if anyone in their household had hunted and 2% expressed no opinion. Species reported by the respondents to have been hunted included iguana (Iguana iguana), deer (Mazama americana, Odocoileus virginianus), tinamou (Tinamidae), bobo fish (Joturus pichardi) and paca (Agouti paca). Bobo fish, paca, and tinamou were the most popular hunted species.

Additionally, there have been many changes in abundance and species composition within La Selva Biological Station over the past few decades. For example, there have been significant changes to the list of bird species found within the reserve. Since 1960, most of the forest surrounding the Station has been converted to agricultural uses. Although, further research is needed, evidence suggests that insectivorous birds have a significant impact on levels of herbivory, and the loss of a significant fraction of an entire guild, specifically forest understory insectivores, and then top down trophic cascades could alter arthropod and plant communities and ultimately biodiversity.

== Gallery ==
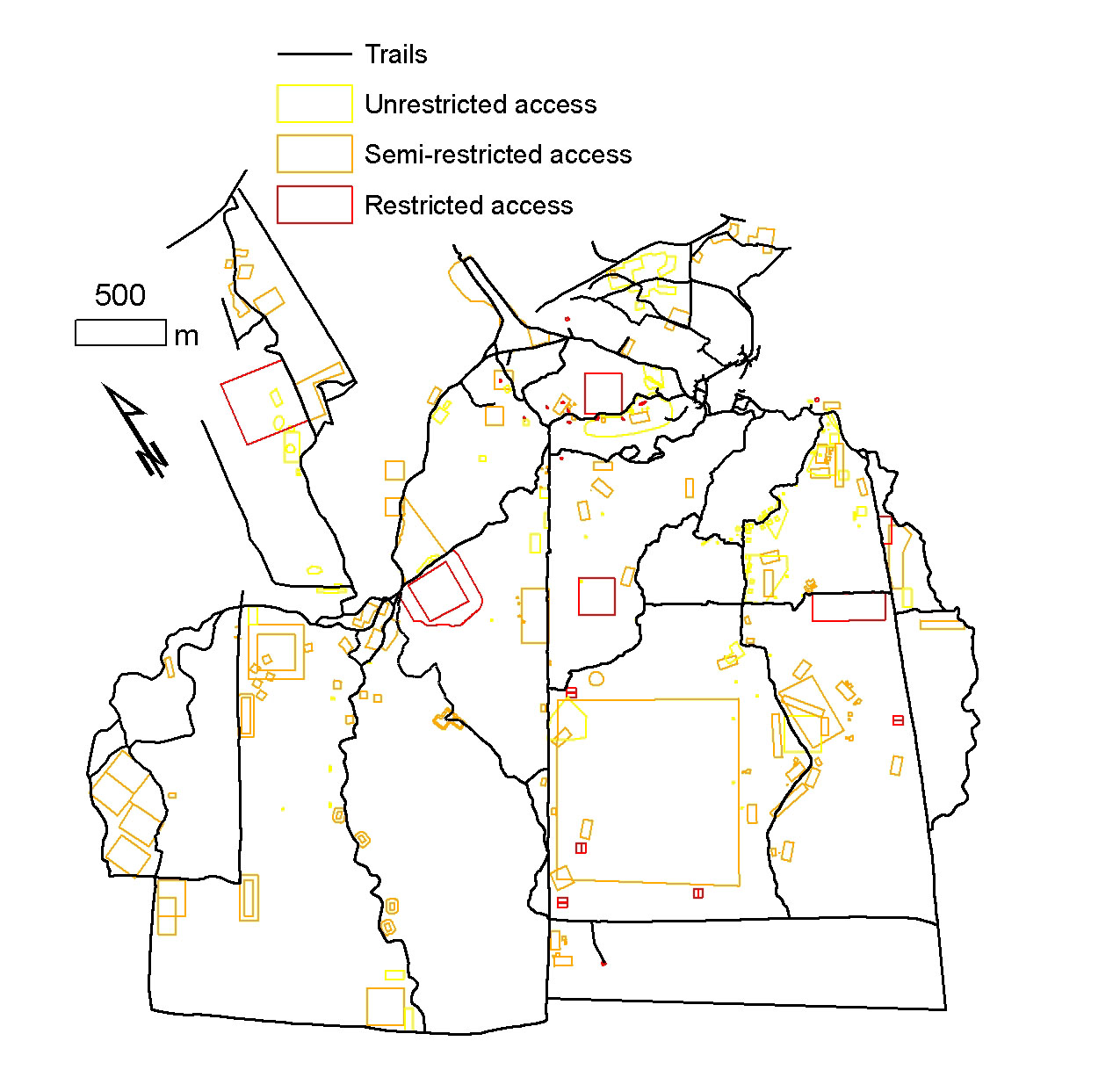
Access within La Selva Biological Station

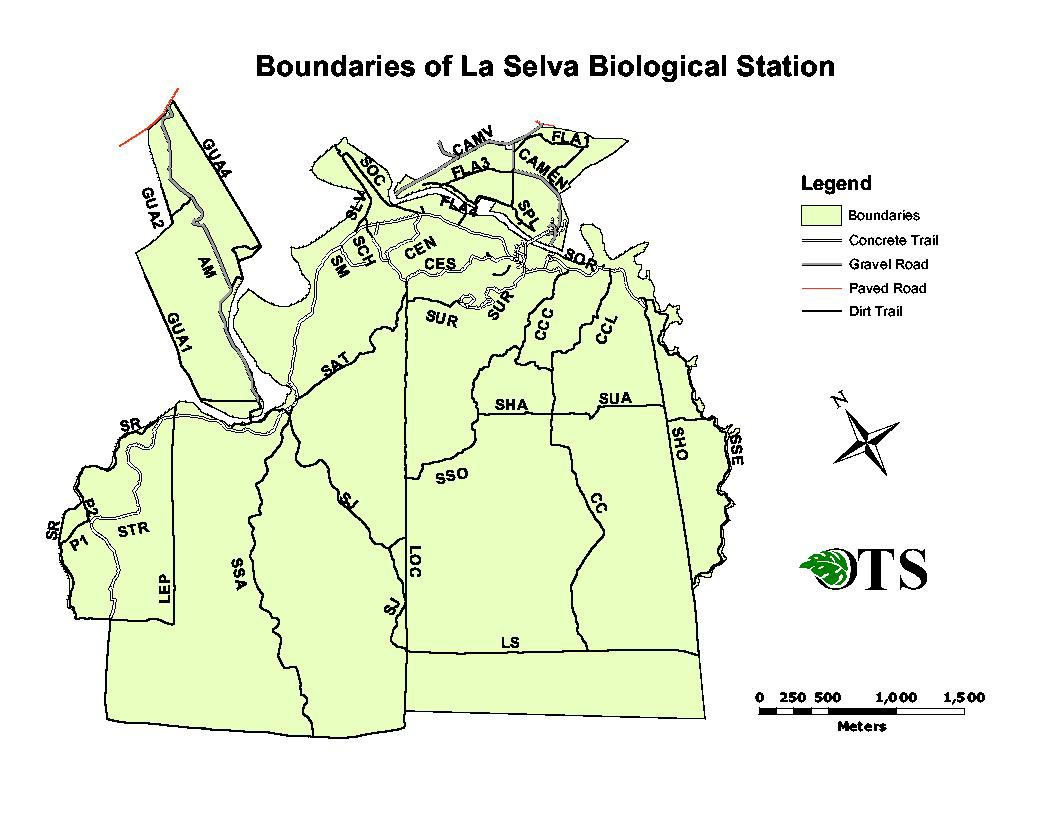
Boundaries of La Selva

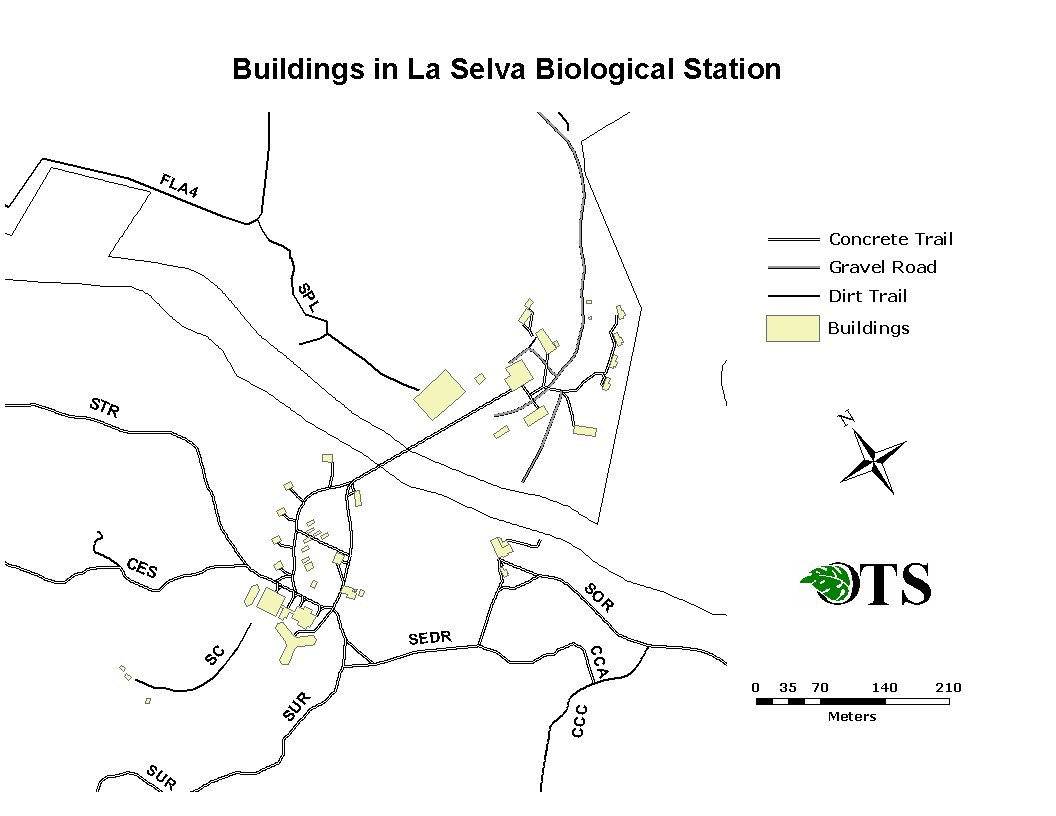
Buildings in La Selva Biological Station

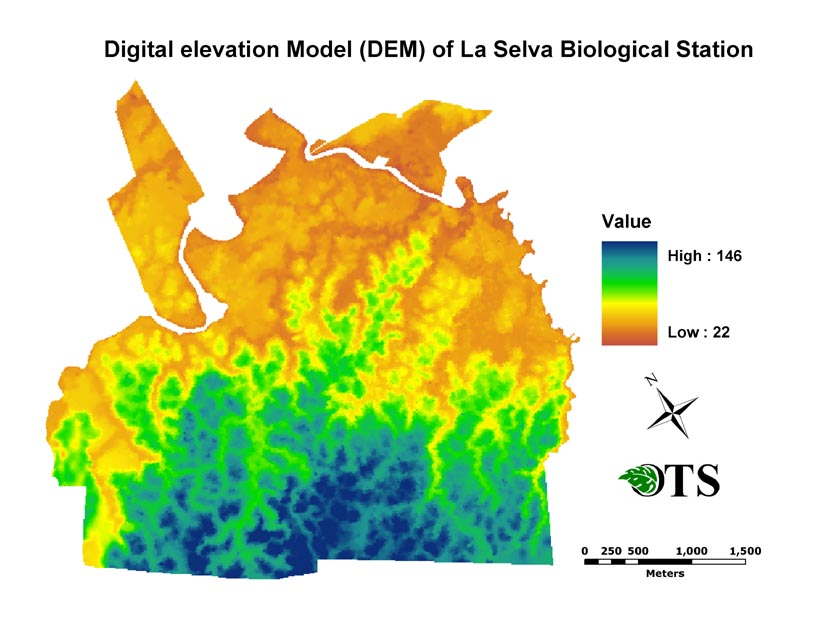
Digital Elevation Model(DEM) of La Selva Biological Station

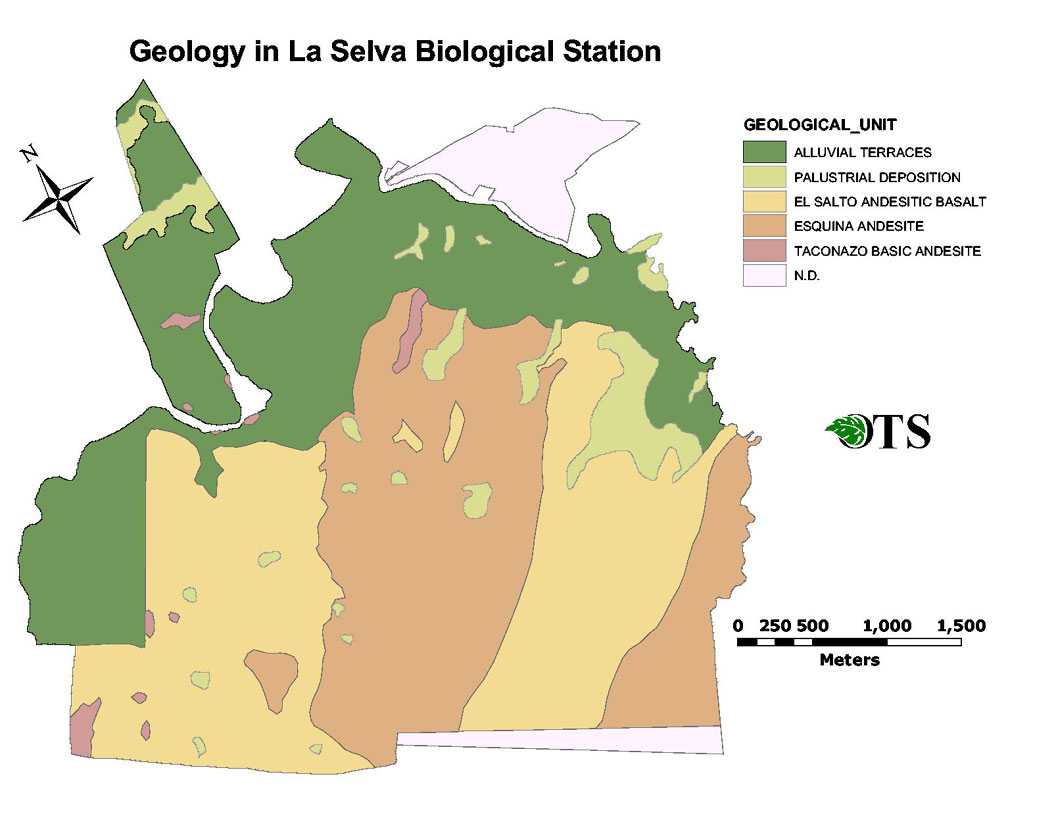
Geology in La Selva Biological Station, Costa Rica

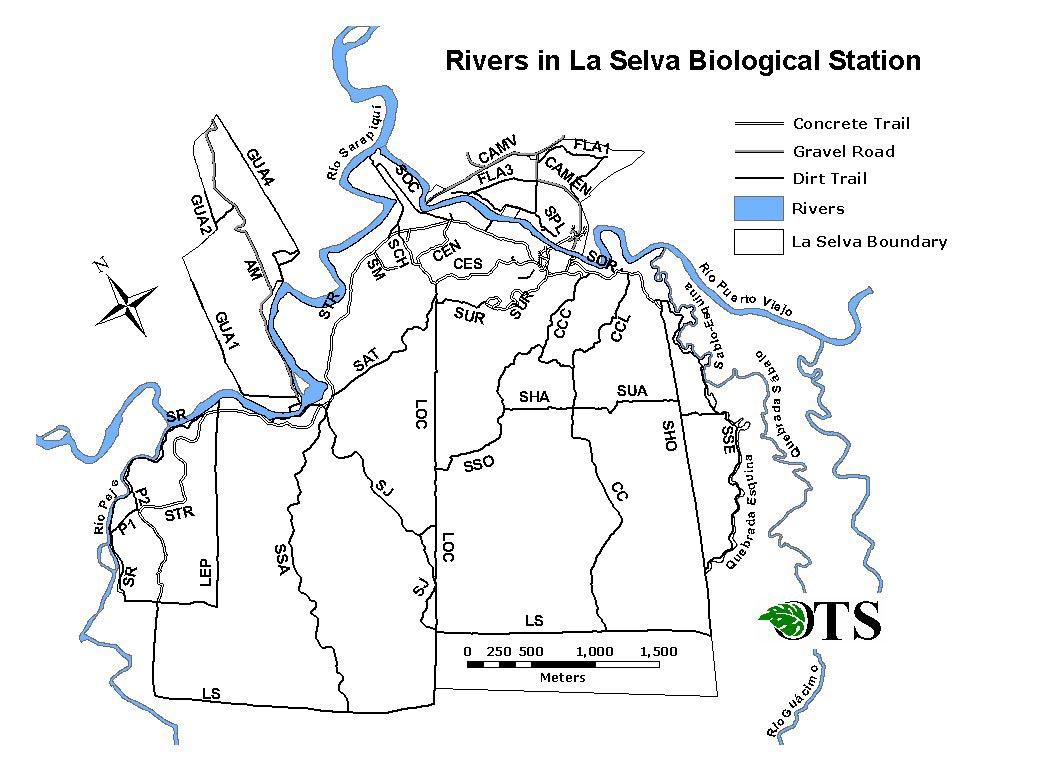
Rivers in La Selva

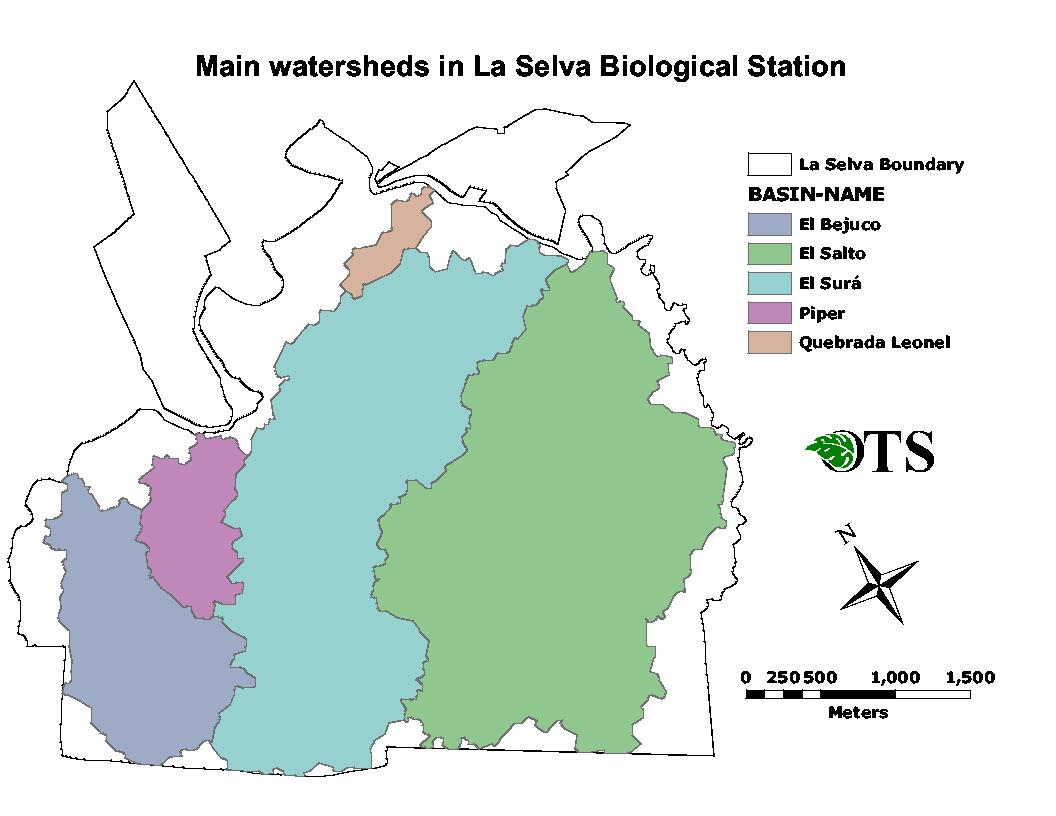
Watersheds in La Selva

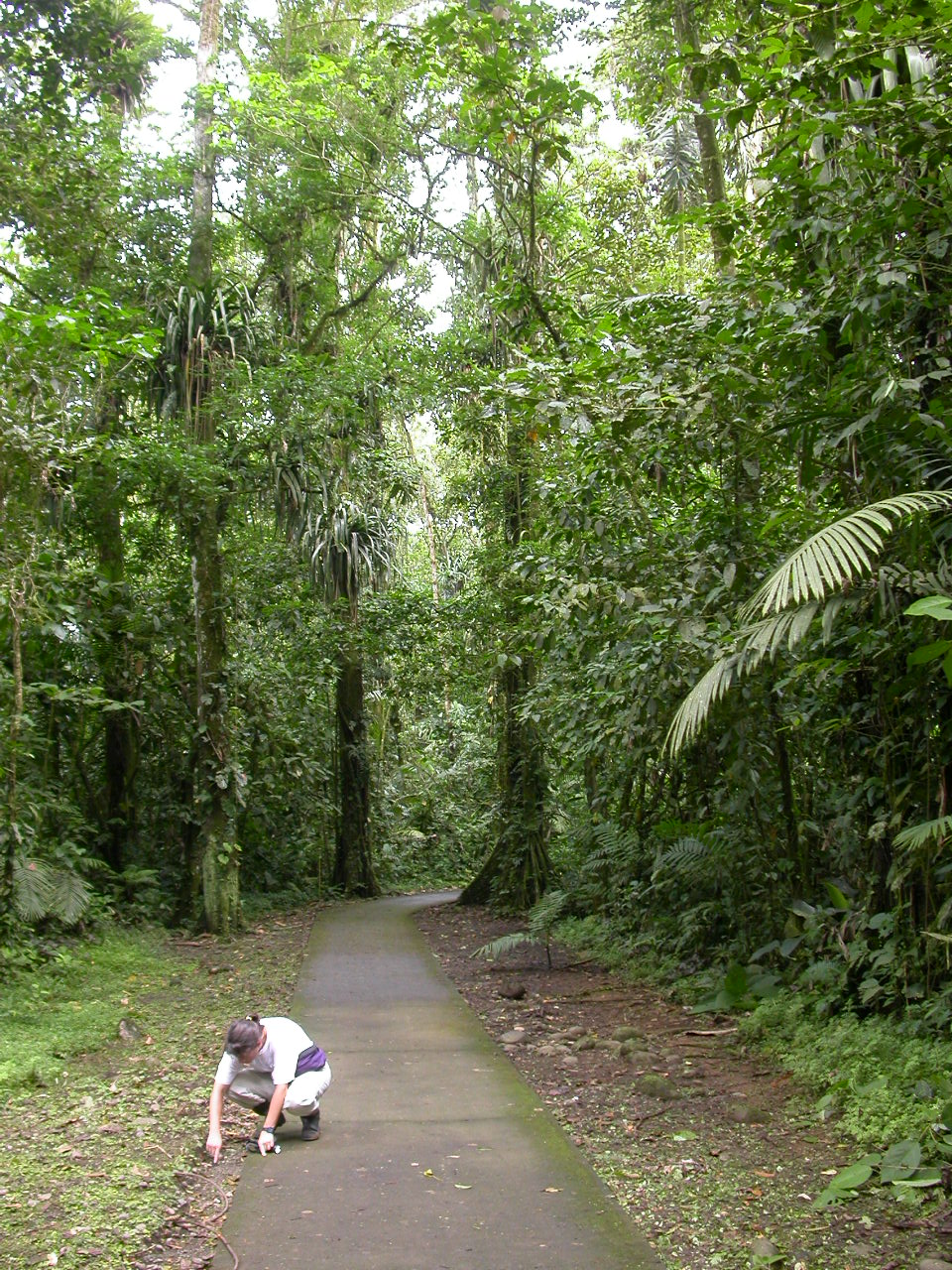
The main path through La Selva

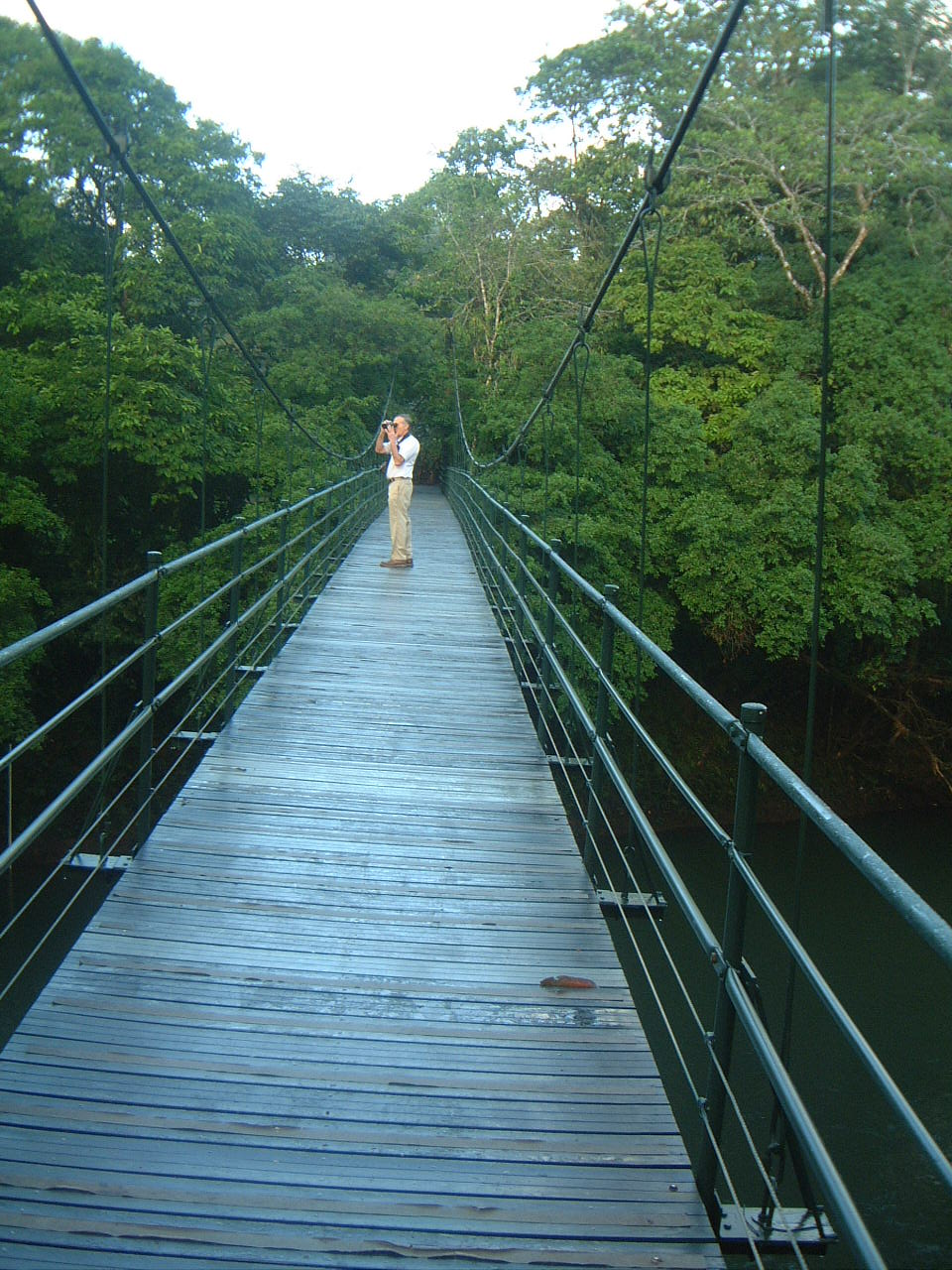
The bridge over the Puerto Viejo River in La Selva

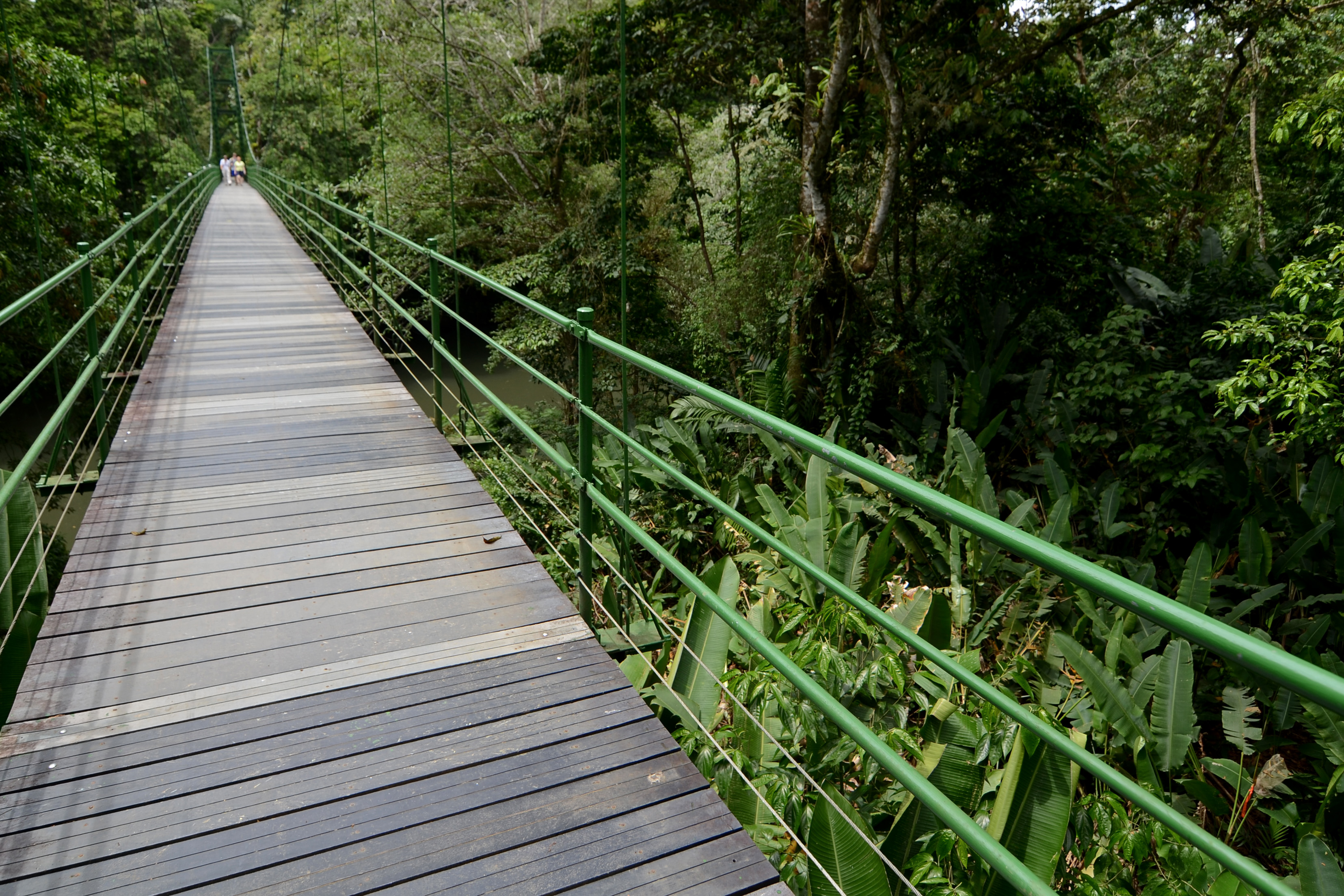
Bridge in La Selva

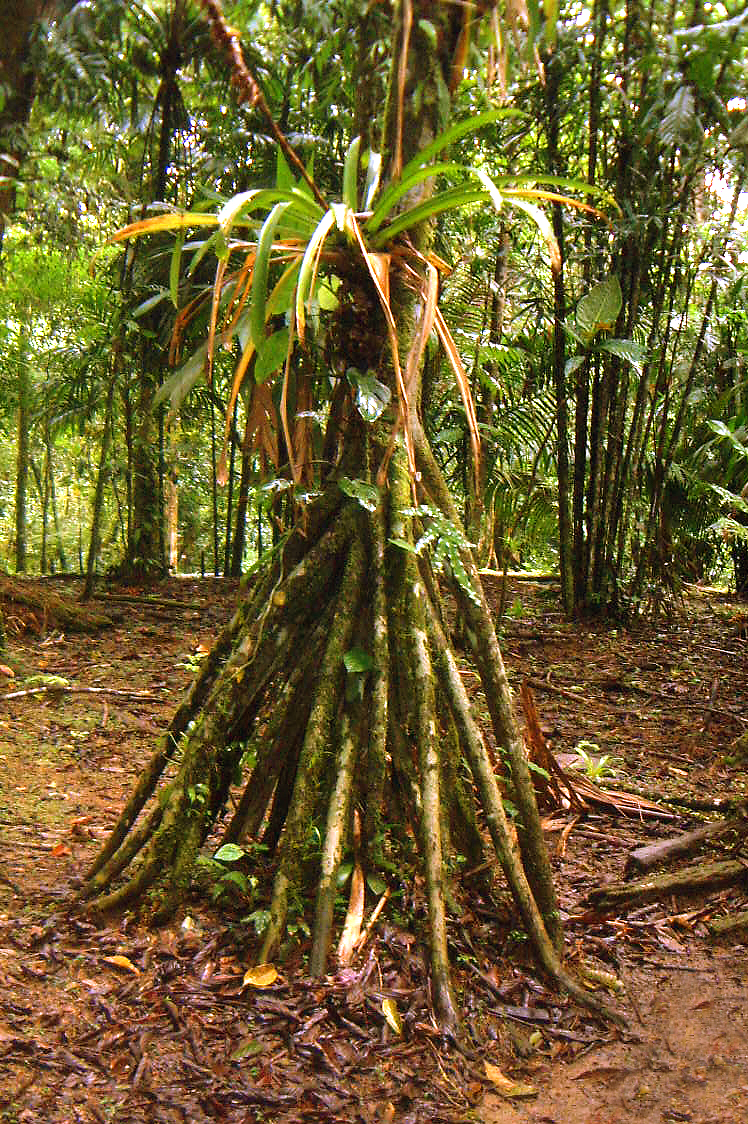
A Walking Palm at La Selva

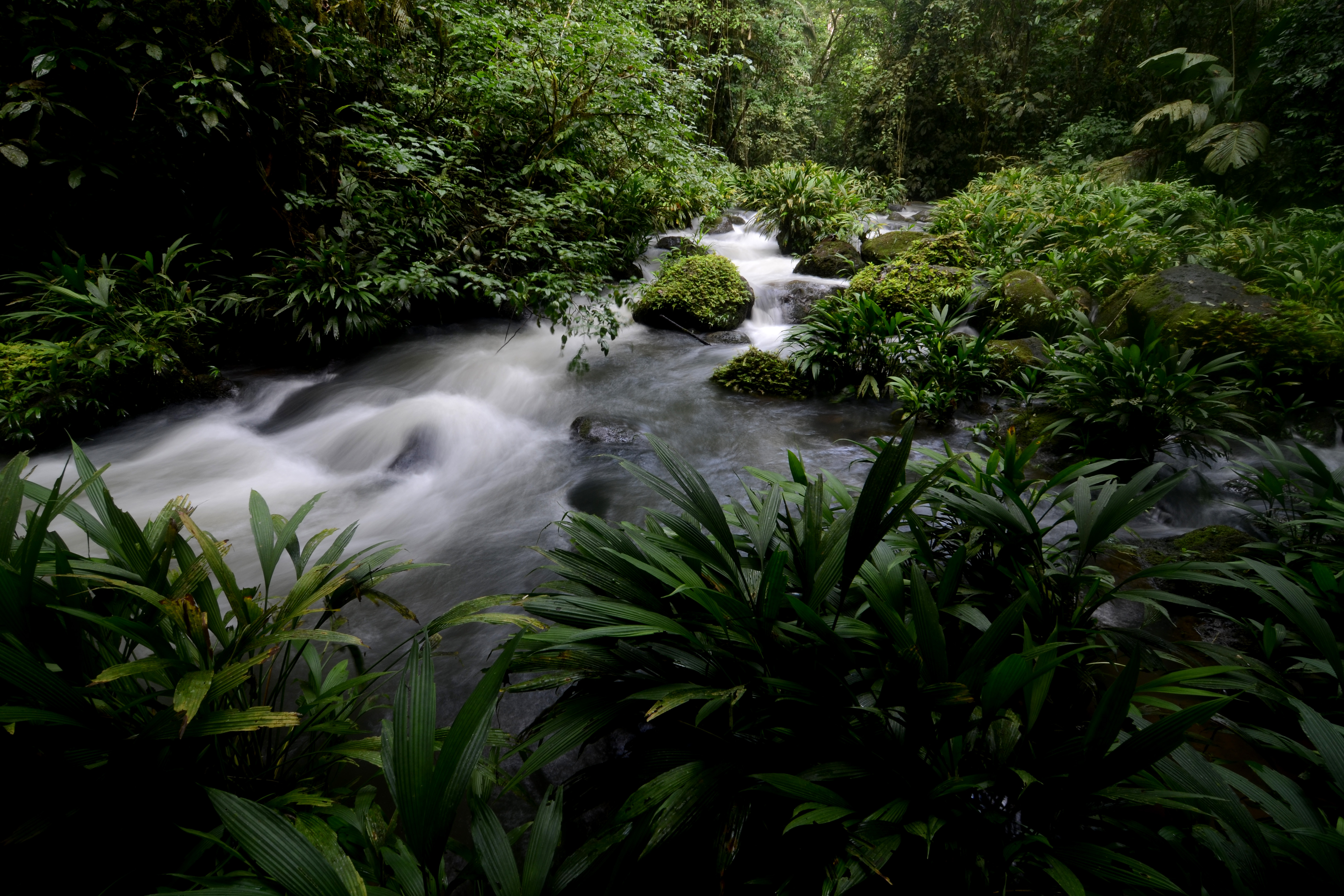
The habitat

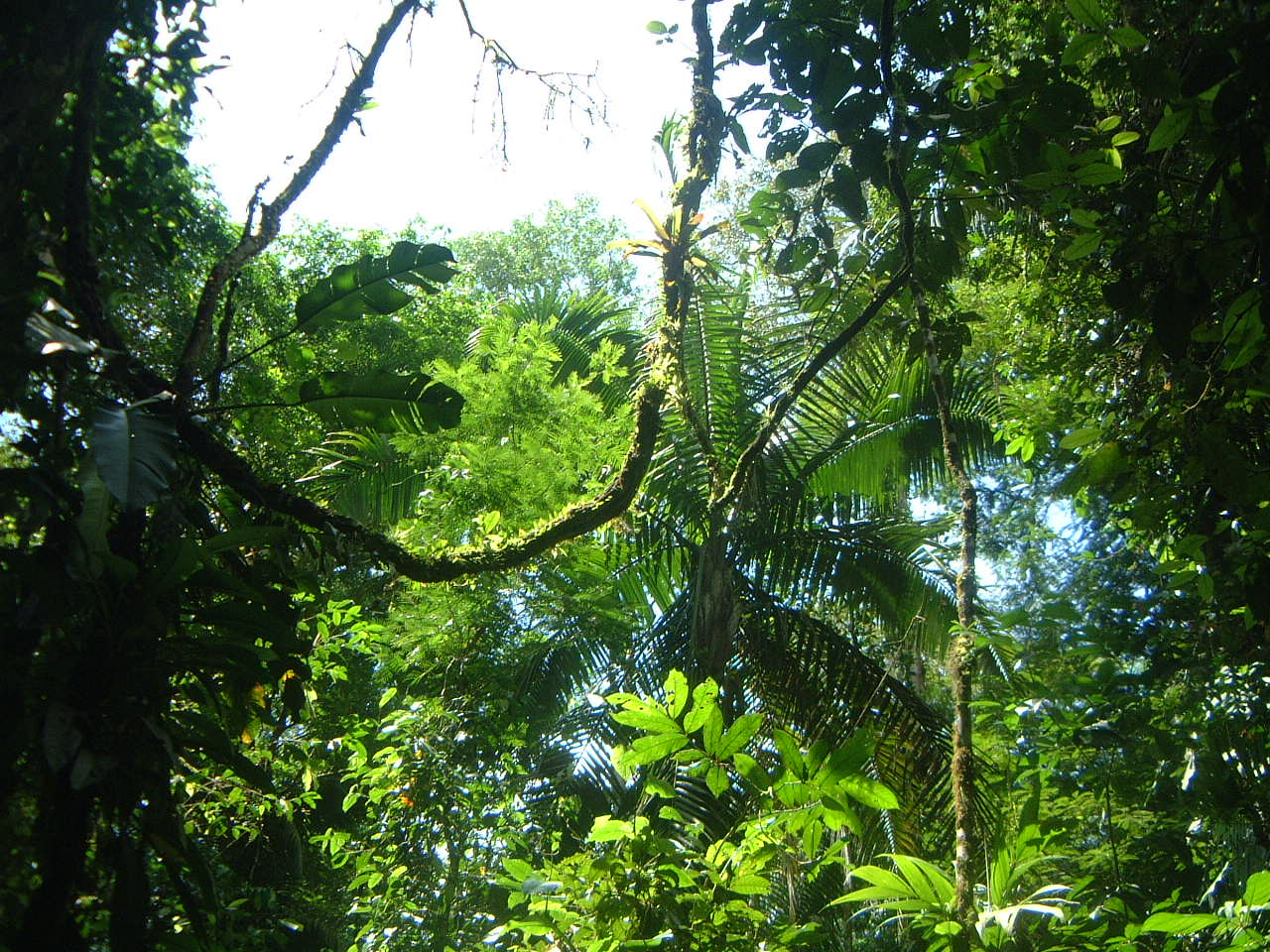
The jungle

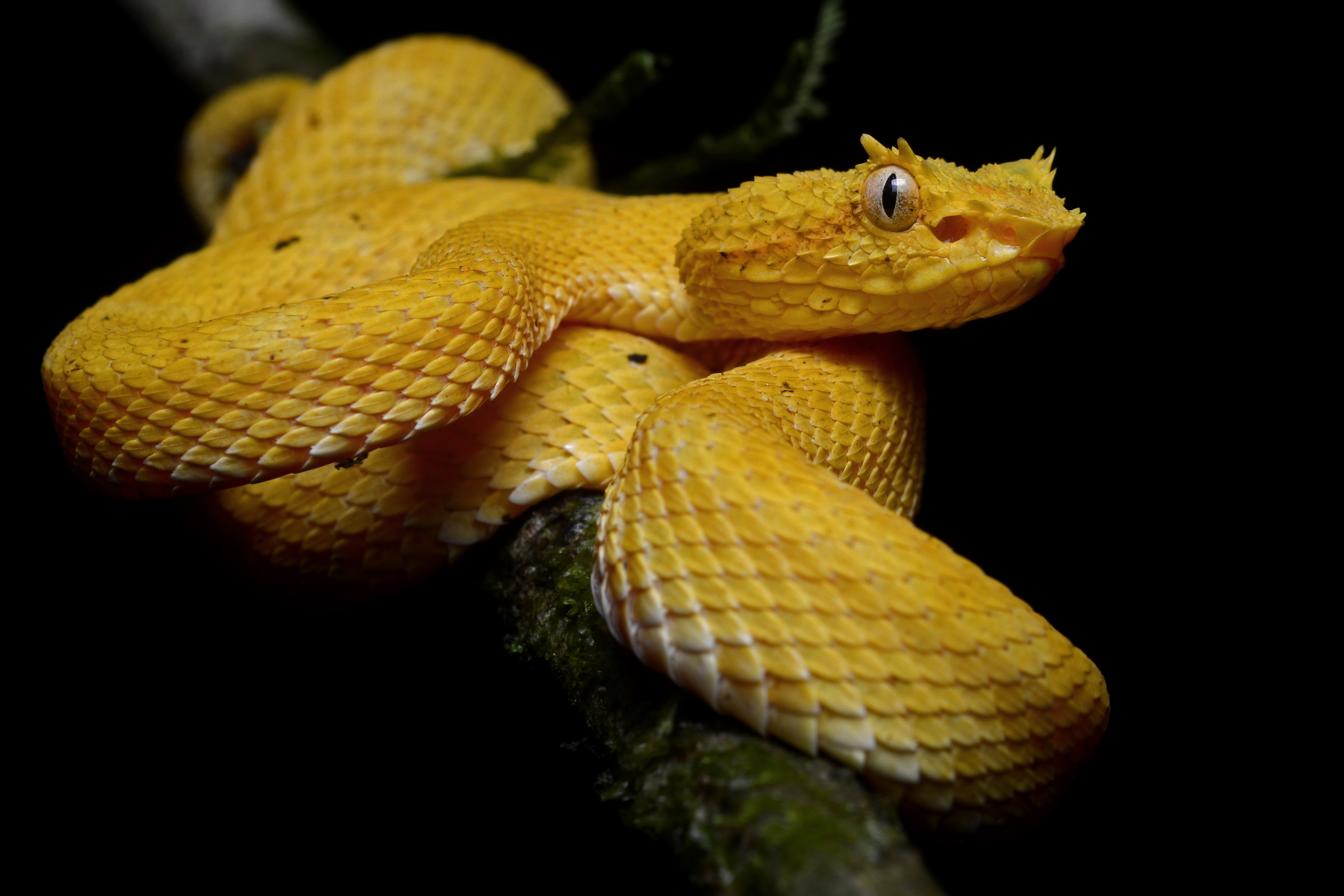
Bothriechis nigroadspersus

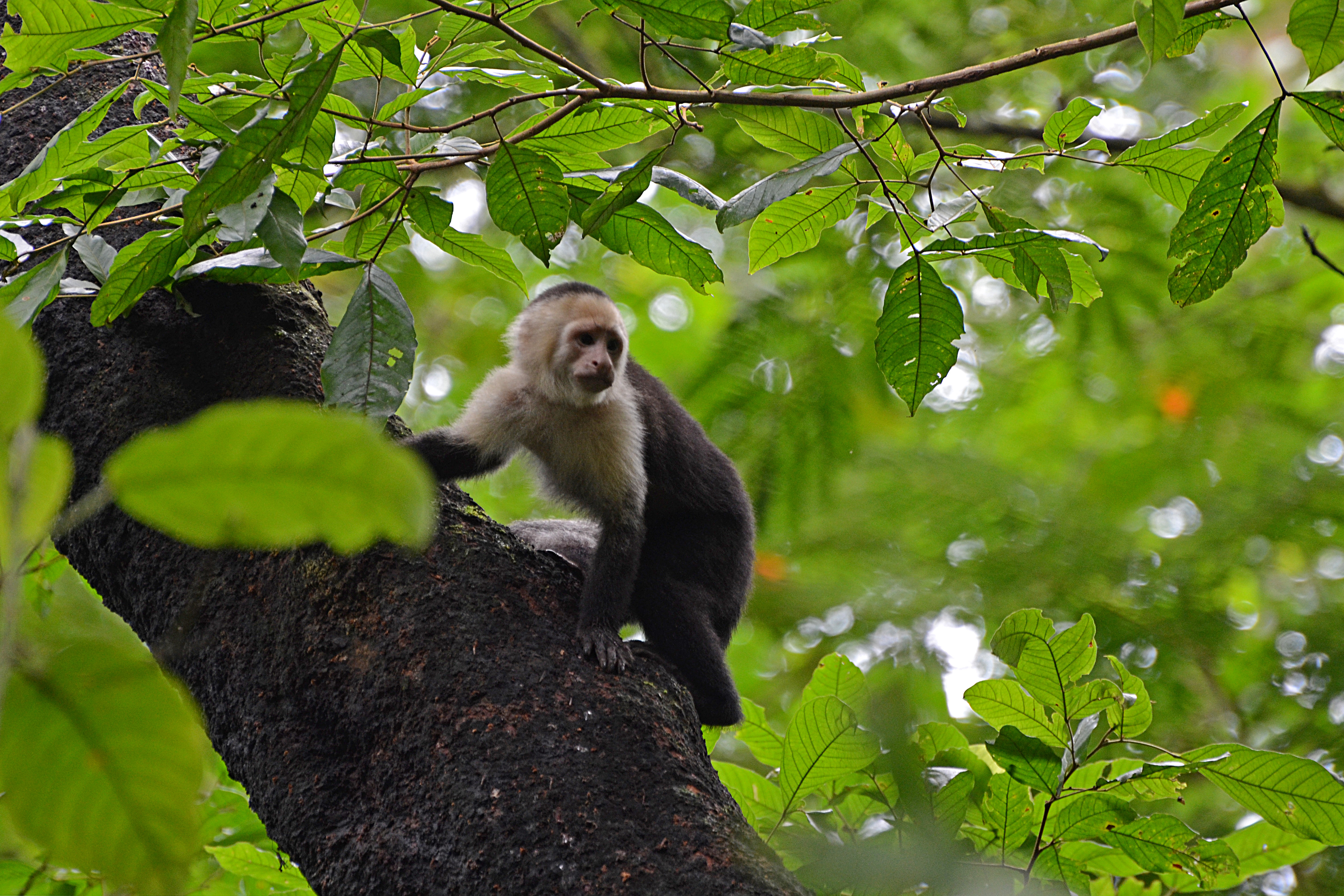
Cebus imitator

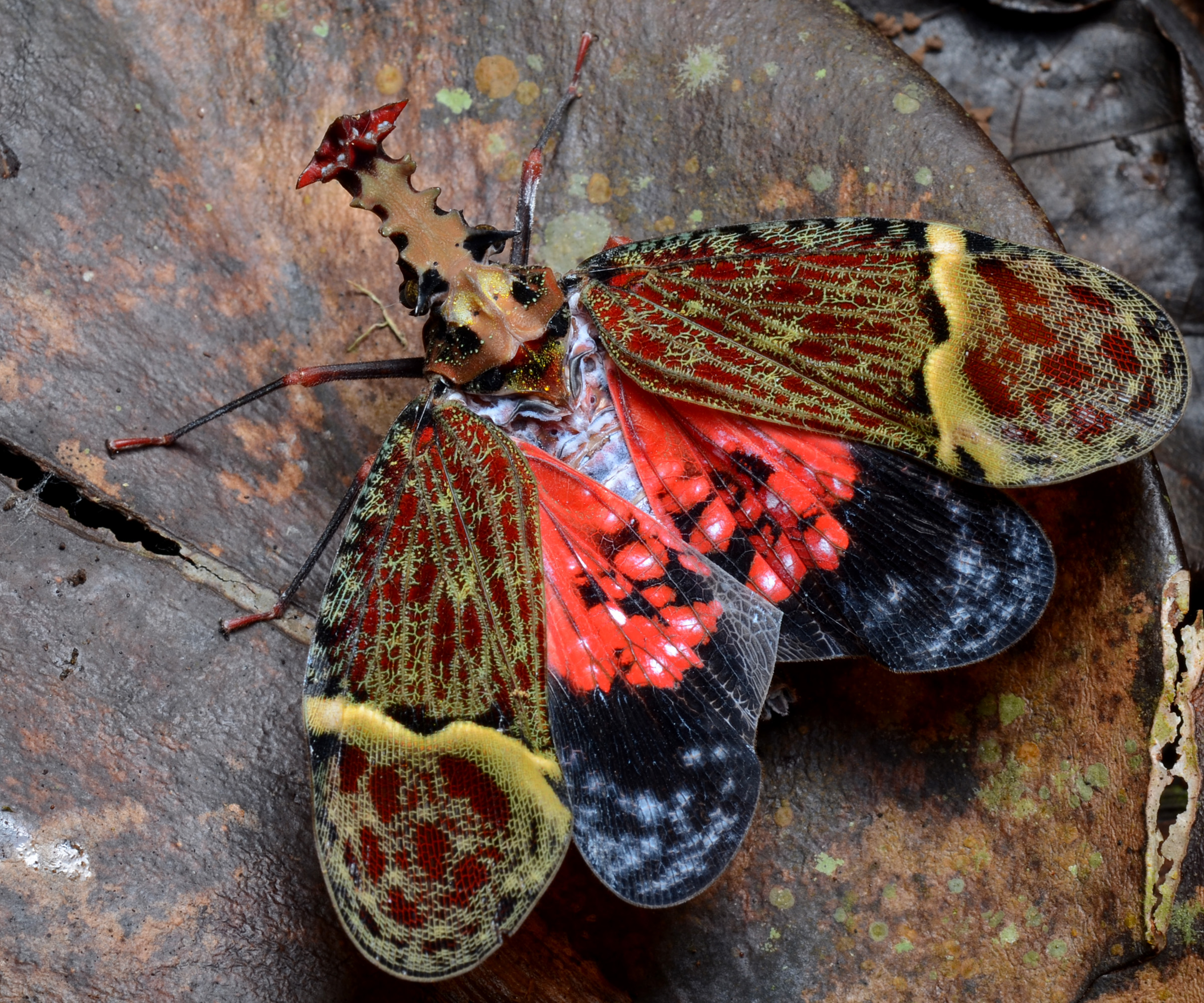
Phrictus quinquepartitus

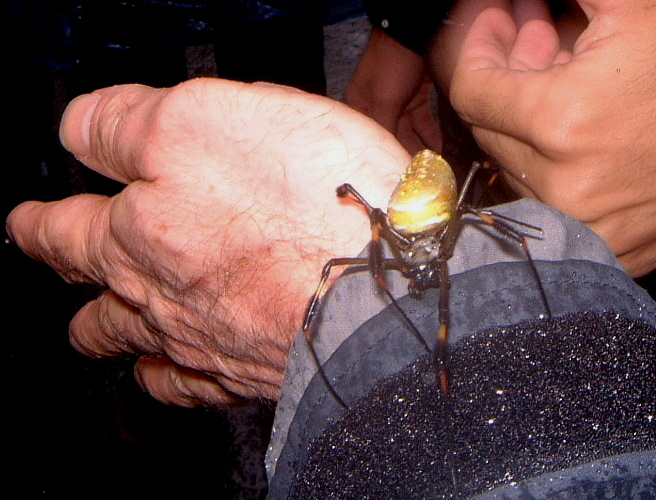
Trichonephila clavipes

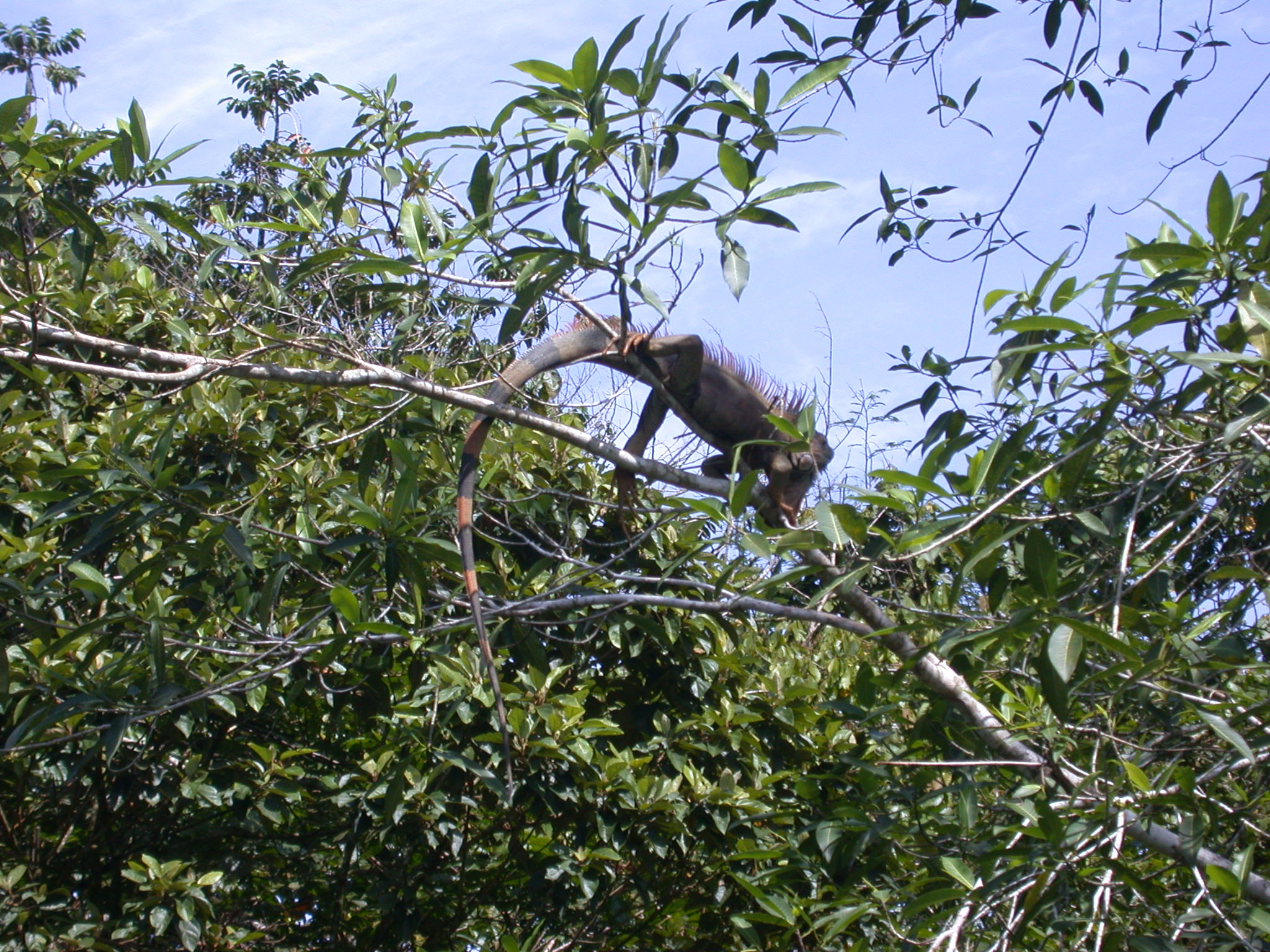
Iguana iguana

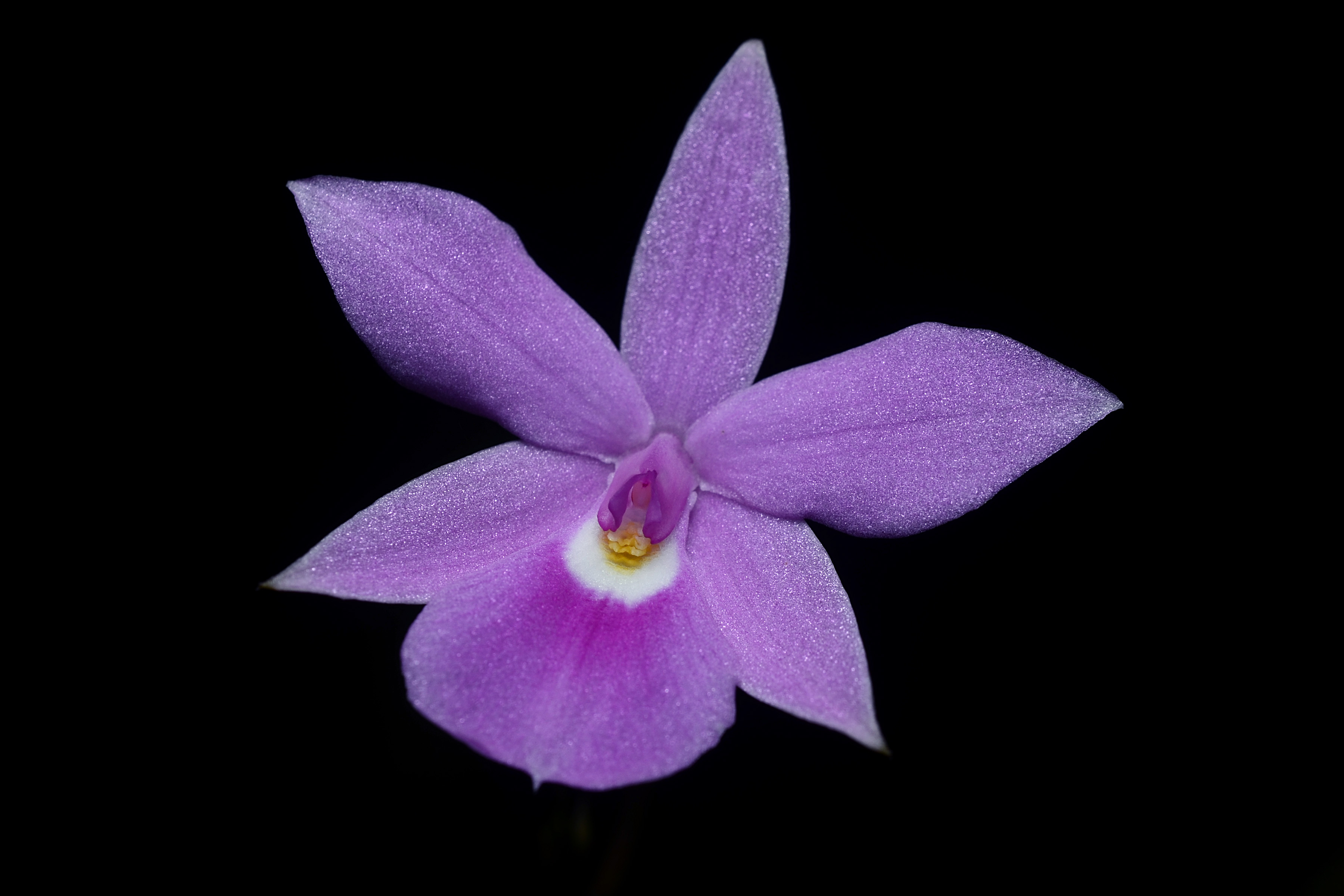
Deimerandra emarginata

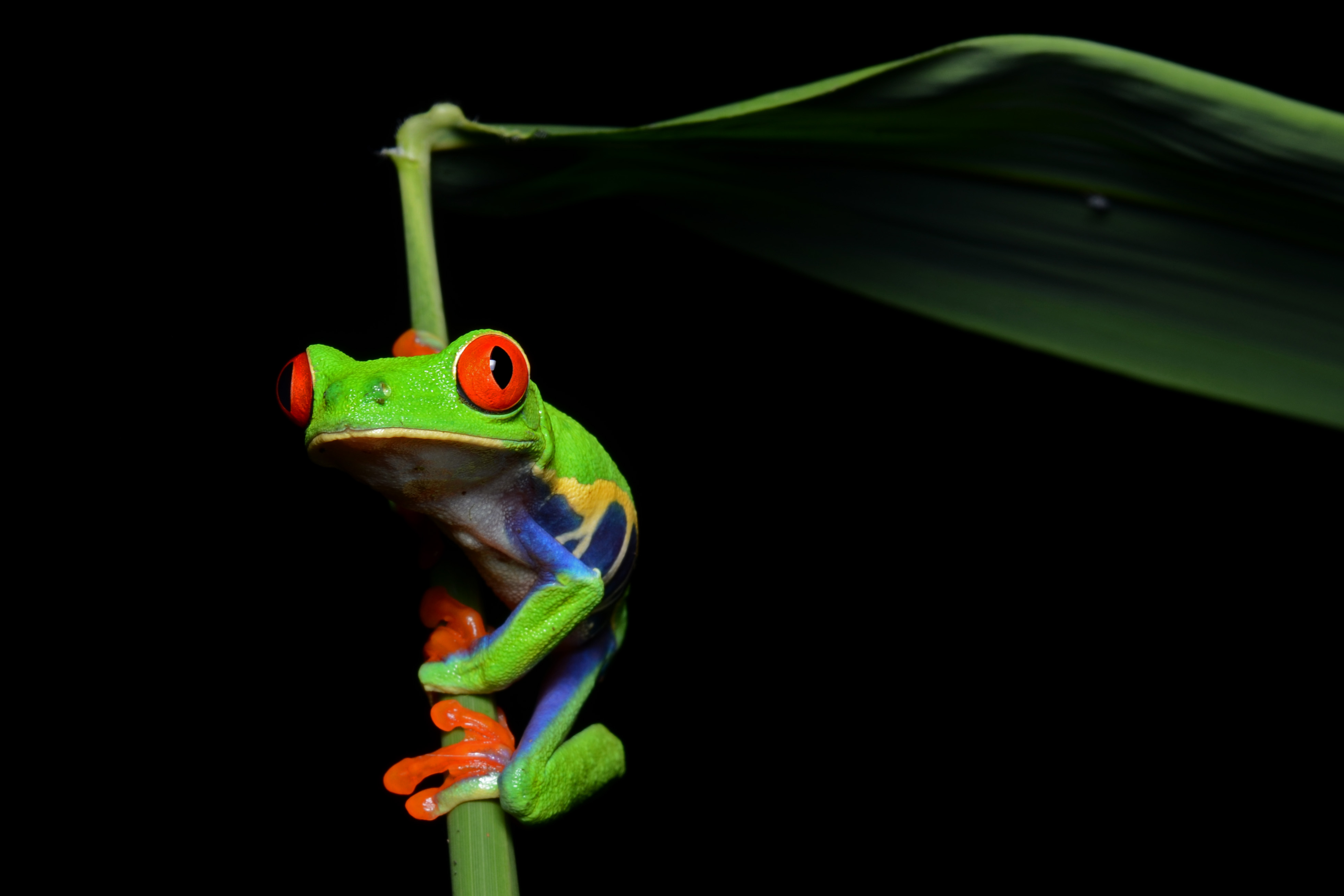
Agalychnis callidryas

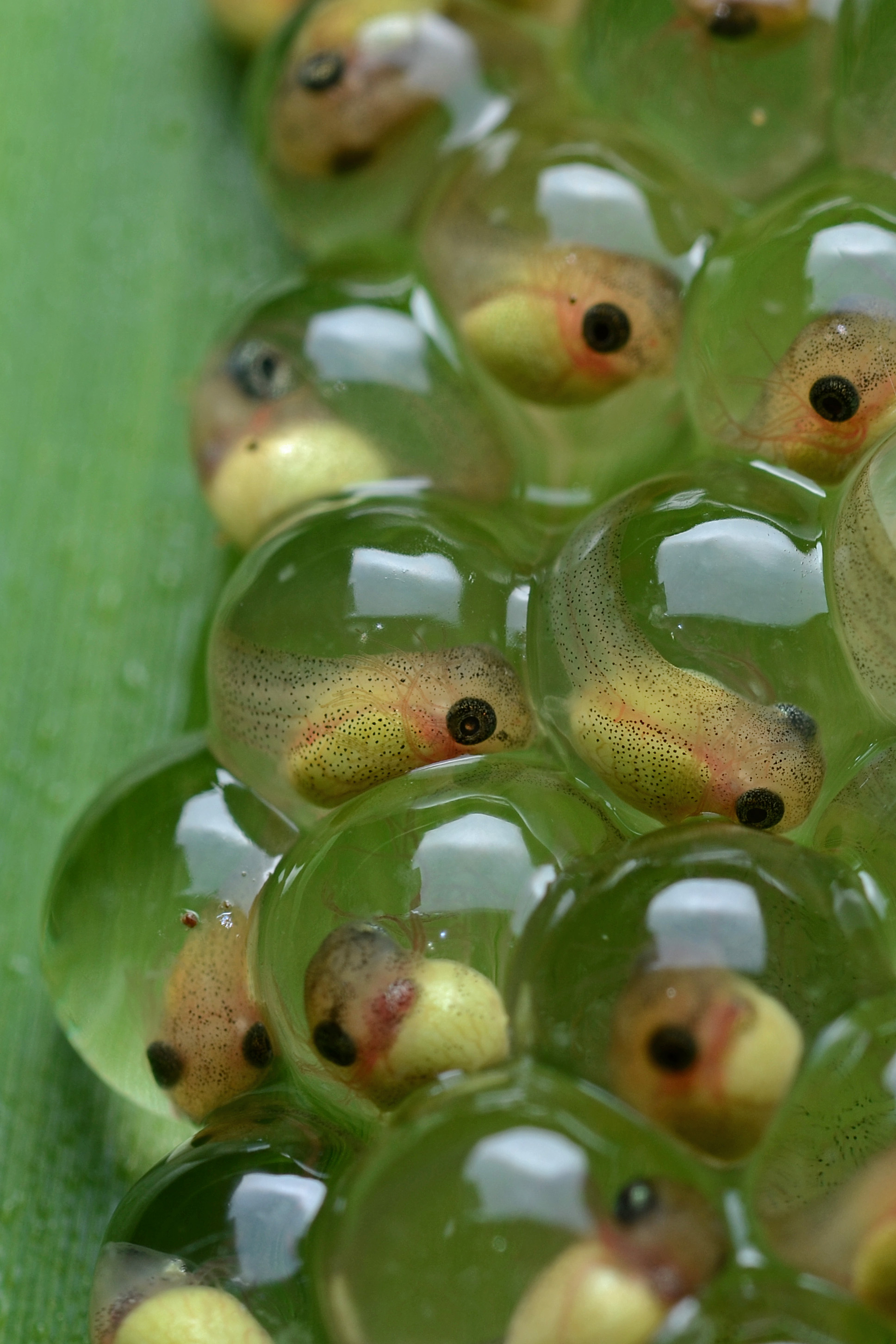
Agalychnis callidryas tadpoles

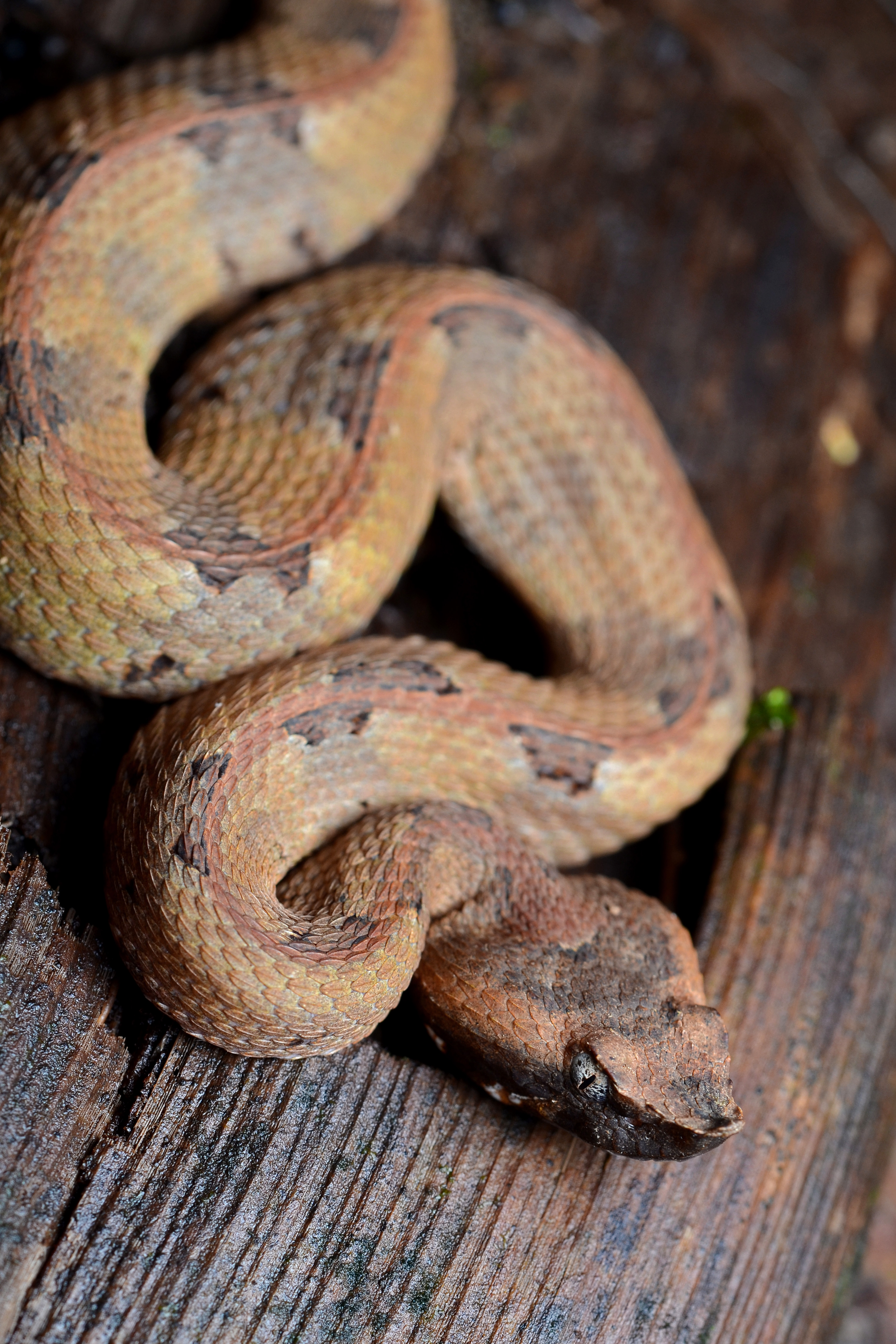
Porthidium nasutum

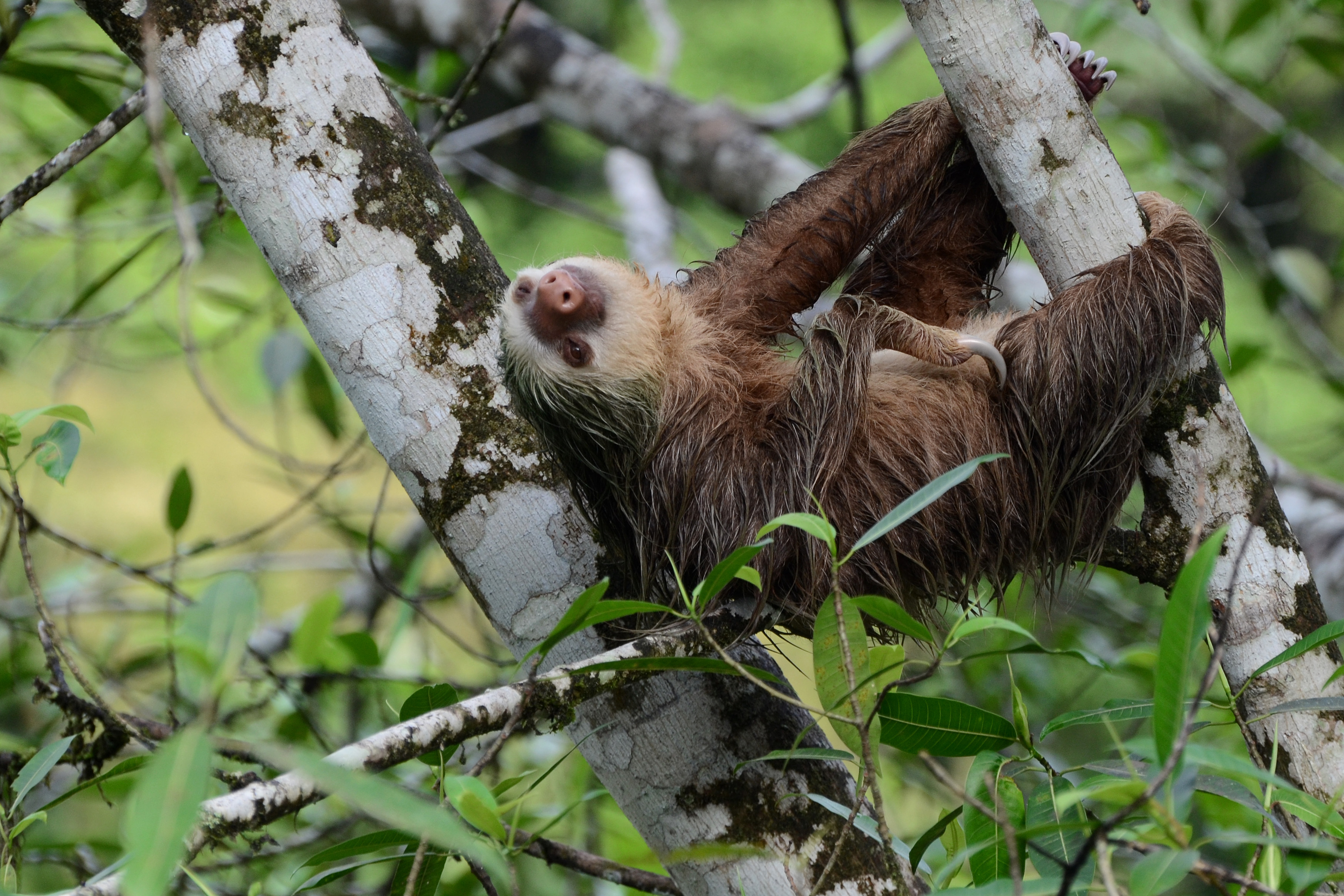
Choloepus hoffmanni

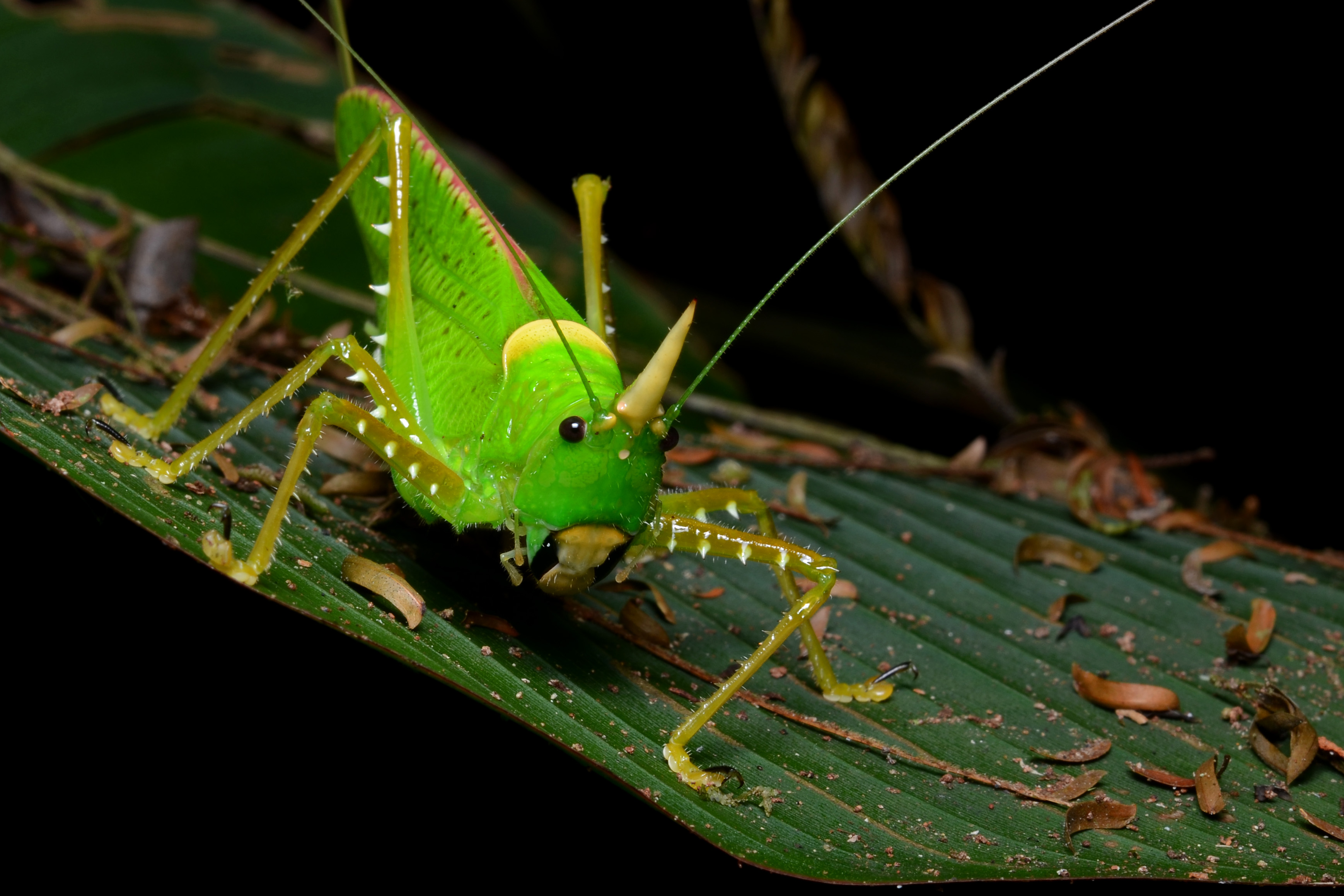
Orange-horn Katydid (Copiphora spp.)

== See also ==
- UGA Costa Rica
