= Paloverde (disambiguation) =

Paloverde is the Americanized name of Parkinsonia, a genus of flowering plants in the pea family, Fabaceae.

Paloverde may also refer to:

- USS Paloverde (YN-86), a Ailanthus-class net tender
- Paloverde, the former name of Palo Verde, California

== See also ==
- Palo Verde (disambiguation)
