= Palo Verde Biological Station =

The Palo Verde Biological Research Station is located in the Guanacaste Province of Costa Rica, and is one of the three research stations operated by the Organization for Tropical Studies (OTS). The Biological Research Station is located inside Palo Verde National Park. Palo Verde Biological Research Station is one of the foremost sites for ecological research on tropical dry forests, which constitute one of the most endangered forest types in the world.

Palo Verde National Park was declared a Wildlife Refuge during the 1970s; over 60 different species of birds used the Laguna, or wetland, as a migratory stop. However, the introduction of Typha domingensis (southern cattail) has interfered with bird migration. The OTS, an advisor to the Ministry of the Environment and Energy, has been researching the restoration of the wetlands. In the 1990s, the park was put on the Ramsar list of wetlands of international importance and also on the Montreux Record.

Mammals found near the station include the mantled howler monkey, the white-throated capuchin, and the collared peccary. American crocodiles can be observed in the Rio Tempisque.

The station includes a library, herbarium, and weather station. Professors from the United States and the University of Costa Rica offer courses at the station, and ecologists give tours for visitors.
