= Palo Verde National Park =

National Park of Costa Rica

- IUCN category II (national park)
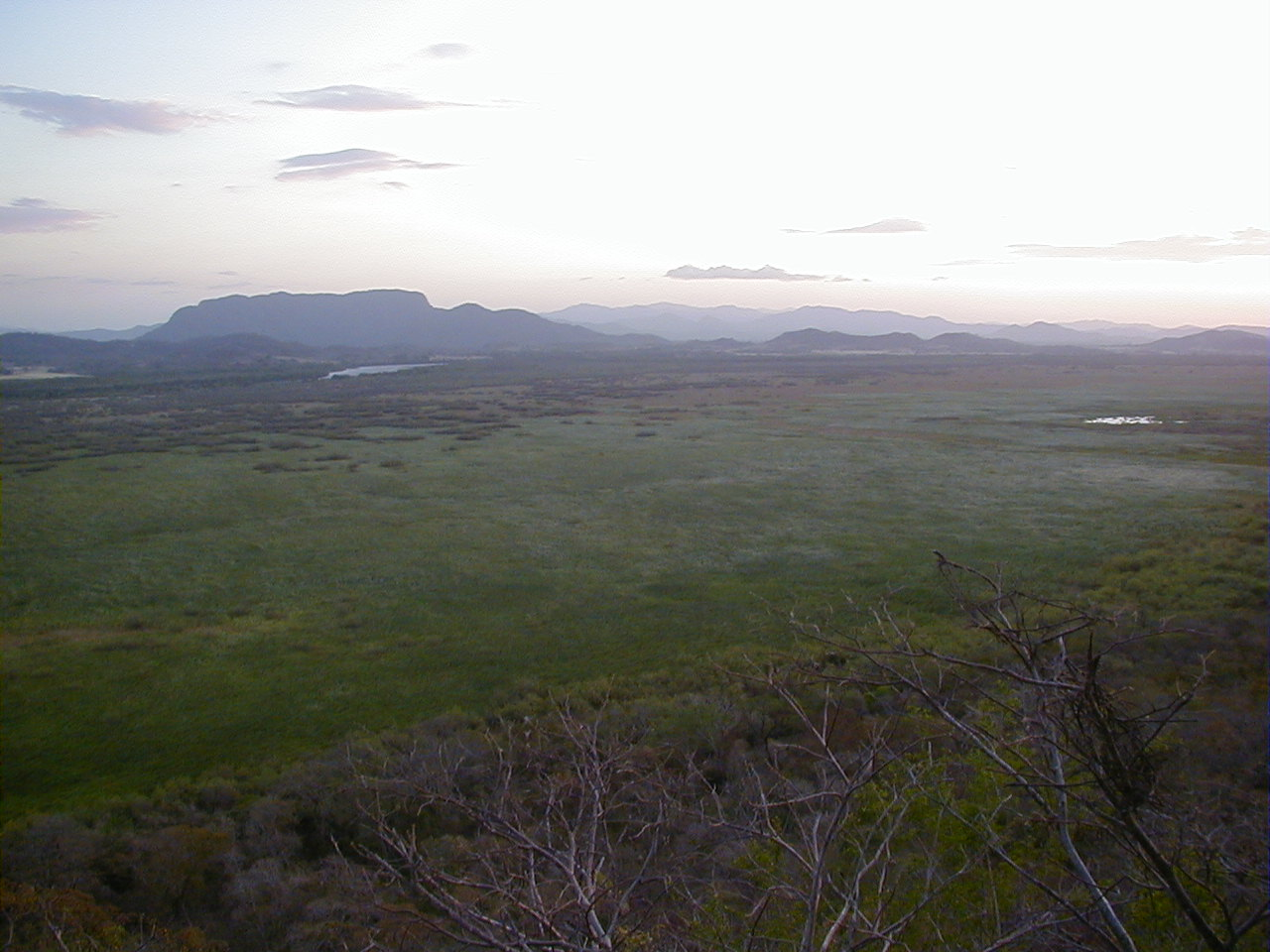
- Marshlands flanking the Tempisque River in Palo Verde National Park
- Interactive map of Palo Verde National Park
- Location: Costa Rica
- Coordinates: 10°20′0″N 85°20′0″W
- Area: 184 km^{2} (71 sq mi)
- Established: 1978
- Governing body: National System of Conservation Areas (SINAC)

Ramsar Wetland
- Official name: Palo Verde
- Designated: 27 December 1991
- Reference no.: 540

Palo Verde National Park (Spanish: Parque Nacional Palo Verde), is a national park of Costa Rica, part of the Arenal Tempisque Conservation Area, that contains much of the area of the valley of the Tempisque River and covers an area of 18,400 ha (45,000 acres) in Guanacaste Province, 30 km west of Canas.

== Environment ==
The park protects one of the most endangered ecosystems. It is one of the last remaining tropical dry rainforests that once covered most of Central America. Tropical dry rainforests exist in less than 0.1% of their original size and are considered to be the most endangered ecosystems in the tropics. The surrounding region is mostly tropical dry forests, and the park concentrates on conserving vital floodplain, marshes, limestone ridges, and seasonal pools from the encroachment of civilization which was putting the ecology of the area at risk.

=== Birds ===
A major feature of the park is the density and variety of bird species, a major factor in the creation of the reserve, due in part to its diverse ecology, with 15 topographical zones from evergreen forests to mangrove swamps. It has been designated an Important Bird Area (IBA) by BirdLife International. Birds seen regularly in the park include great curassows, scarlet macaws, white ibis, roseate spoonbills, anhingas, jabirus, and wood storks.

During the dry season water is scarce in other parts of the country. Due to this, many birds flock to the park and its river basin. Parajos Island, which is located in the middle of the Tempisque River, is usually a great place to spot birds. This island is the largest nesting site for the black-crowned night-herons in Costa Rica.

== History ==
Palo Verde National Park was declared a wildlife refuge during the 1970s because over 60 species of birds used the laguna, or wetland, as a migratory stop. There were once 35,000 black bellied whistling ducks, 25,000 blue winged teal, and several hundred migrating ducks during the dry season. Later the park was declared a national park and operated under the government agency MINAE (Ministry of Environment, Energy and Telecommunications). In the 1990s, the park was put on the Ramsar list of wetlands of international importance and also on the Montreux Record.

== Access ==
The park has a ranger station which is open for visitors from 8 am to dusk, with potable water and restrooms. The Palo Verde Biological Station is on site; it is operated by the Organization for Tropical Studies.
