= Pyrenula rubroanomala =

Scientific classification
- Kingdom: Fungi
- Division: Ascomycota
- Class: Eurotiomycetes
- Order: Pyrenulales
- Family: Pyrenulaceae
- Genus: Pyrenula
- Species: P. rubroanomala

Binomial name
- Pyrenula rubroanomala Aptroot & Lucking (2008)

Species of lichen-forming fungus

Pyrenula rubroanomala is a species of corticolous (bark-dwelling), crustose lichen in the family Pyrenulaceae. The species is characterized by its pale, thickened thallus and by clusters of small, black, flask-shaped fruiting bodies that often merge into irregular, rounded patches. A distinctive feature is the thin red pigment layer over these clusters, which turns purple when tested with potassium hydroxide solution. It is known from the type locality in Costa Rica, where it was found growing on tree bark in secondary vegetation in a moist lowland forest zone.

== Taxonomy ==
It was described as a new species in 2008 by the lichenologists André Aptroot and Robert Lücking, based on material collected in Palo Verde National Park in Guanacaste Province, Costa Rica. The holotype is housed in the herbarium of the Field Museum of Natural History.

== Description ==
The lichen forms thick, corticate patches of thallus (the main lichen body) that are ochraceous yellowish-gray and often have a dusty white surface coating (pruinose). Colonies may reach about 2 cm (0.8 in) across, and can be bordered by a narrow black line of hypothallus (a dark marginal zone of fungal tissue), though this border may be absent. Its perithecia (flask-shaped fruiting bodies) sit on the surface as small, hemispherical bumps. Around 10–25 perithecia can fuse laterally into irregular, rounded stromatic clusters about 1–2 mm wide, giving a strongly melanothecioid appearance. These clusters are covered by a thin, partly eroding layer of red pigment, and each perithecium has a tiny, black, centrally placed ostiole (opening).

Under the microscope, the threads between the spore-producing sacs (the hamathecium among the asci) are clear rather than oil-filled, and they do not react with iodine (IKI–). Each ascus contains eight gray-brown ascospores with three internal cross-walls (distoseptate), measuring about 15–17 × 5–6 μm. Inside each spore, the compartments (lumina) are angular to diamond-shaped, with the end compartments smaller than the central ones. In standard lichen spot tests, the thallus is UV–, while the red stromatic pigment turns purple with potassium hydroxide solution (K+), consistent with an anthraquinone-type pigment.

== Habitat and distribution ==
In the type locality, the species was found on bark on the lower trunk in secondary forest and open secondary vegetation in a moist forest zone at about 10 m (33 ft) elevation. The original description treated it as the first strongly melanothecioid Pyrenula known to have a red anthraquinone pigment. It resembles Pyrenula anomala in its spores and perithecial organization, while the pigment recalls that of Pyrenula cruenta and Pyrenula cruentata. It was reported growing alongside other bark-dwelling lichens including Pyrenula anomala, Trypethelium ochroleucum, and Glyphis substriatula.

== See also ==
- List of Pyrenula species
