= Palo Verde, El Salvador =

Palo Verde
- Canton
- Location in El Salvador
- Coordinates: 13°53′6″N 89°47′22″W
- Country: El Salvador
- Department: Ahuachapán
- Municipality: Apaneca
- Elevation: 1,657 m (5,436 ft)

Population
  - Total: 334
- Time zone: UTC-6 (El Salvador Standard Time)

Palo Verde is a canton in Apaneca Municipality, Ahuachapán Department in El Salvador.

== Climate ==
Palo Verde has a Subtropical highland climate (Cwb) with very wet summers and much drier winters.

Climate data for Palo Verde
| Month | Jan | Feb | Mar | Apr | May | Jun | Jul | Aug | Sep | Oct | Nov | Dec | Year |
|---|---|---|---|---|---|---|---|---|---|---|---|---|---|
| Mean daily maximum °C (°F) | 21.7 (71.1) | 22.7 (72.9) | 24.4 (75.9) | 24.5 (76.1) | 23.7 (74.7) | 22.4 (72.3) | 22.7 (72.9) | 22.5 (72.5) | 21.8 (71.2) | 21.4 (70.5) | 21.2 (70.2) | 21.1 (70.0) | 22.5 (72.5) |
| Daily mean °C (°F) | 16.8 (62.2) | 17.4 (63.3) | 18.6 (65.5) | 19.2 (66.6) | 19.0 (66.2) | 18.2 (64.8) | 18.4 (65.1) | 18.2 (64.8) | 17.8 (64.0) | 17.5 (63.5) | 17.0 (62.6) | 16.6 (61.9) | 17.9 (64.2) |
| Mean daily minimum °C (°F) | 12.0 (53.6) | 12.1 (53.8) | 12.8 (55.0) | 13.9 (57.0) | 14.3 (57.7) | 14.1 (57.4) | 14.1 (57.4) | 13.9 (57.0) | 13.9 (57.0) | 13.7 (56.7) | 12.8 (55.0) | 12.2 (54.0) | 13.3 (56.0) |
| Average precipitation mm (inches) | 11 (0.4) | 3 (0.1) | 17 (0.7) | 57 (2.2) | 211 (8.3) | 422 (16.6) | 387 (15.2) | 386 (15.2) | 448 (17.6) | 263 (10.4) | 41 (1.6) | 14 (0.6) | 2,260 (88.9) |
Source: Climate-Data.org
