= Montreux Record =

The Montreux Record is a register of wetland sites on the List of Ramsar wetlands of international importance where changes in ecological character have occurred, are occurring, or could likely to occur as a result of technological developments, pollution or other human interference. Established in 1990, it is a voluntary mechanism to highlight specific wetlands of international importance that are facing immediate challenges. It is maintained as part of the List of Ramsar wetlands of international importance.

== List of sites under the Montreux Record ==
As in August 2021, 48 sites are listed in the Montreux Record. The Montreux Record was established by Recommendation 4.8 at the COP-4 in 1990 held at Montreux, Switzerland. It was adopted by the Conference of Contracting parties in Brisbane in 1996.
