= Organization for Tropical Studies =

Non-profit academic consortium in the Americas

The Organization for Tropical Studies (OTS)/Organización para Estudios Tropicales (OET), founded in 1963, is a non-profit consortium of over 50 universities and research institutions based in the United States, Latin America, and South Africa. OTS manages a network of ecological research stations in Costa Rica and South Africa. The North American Office is located on the Duke University campus in Durham, North Carolina. OTS offers a variety of courses in Spanish and English for high school, university, graduate students and professionals. Most of the coursework and research conducted at OTS stations focuses on tropical ecology, and the three research stations in Costa Rica are located in distinct ecoregions. OTS provides housing and a cafeteria for students researchers, and sometime ecotourists. OTS is involved in the policy related to tropical biology through courses, hosting meetings and conferences and managing conservation related projects

Along with Cocha Cashu Biological Station and the Manu Learning Centre in Peru, and the Smithsonian Tropical Research Institute on Barro Colorado Island in Panama, OTS research stations are important sites for research on neotropical ecology.

OTS research stations in Costa Rica:

· La Selva Biological Station: lowland tropical rainforest on the Caribbean lowlands

· Palo Verde Biological Station: tropical dry forest and seasonal freshwater wetlands on north western

· Las Cruces Biological Station: montane rainforest (including higher elevation cloud forest) and site of the Wilson Botanical Garden

OTS research station in South Africa:

· Skukuza Science Leadership Centre: Kruger National Park
