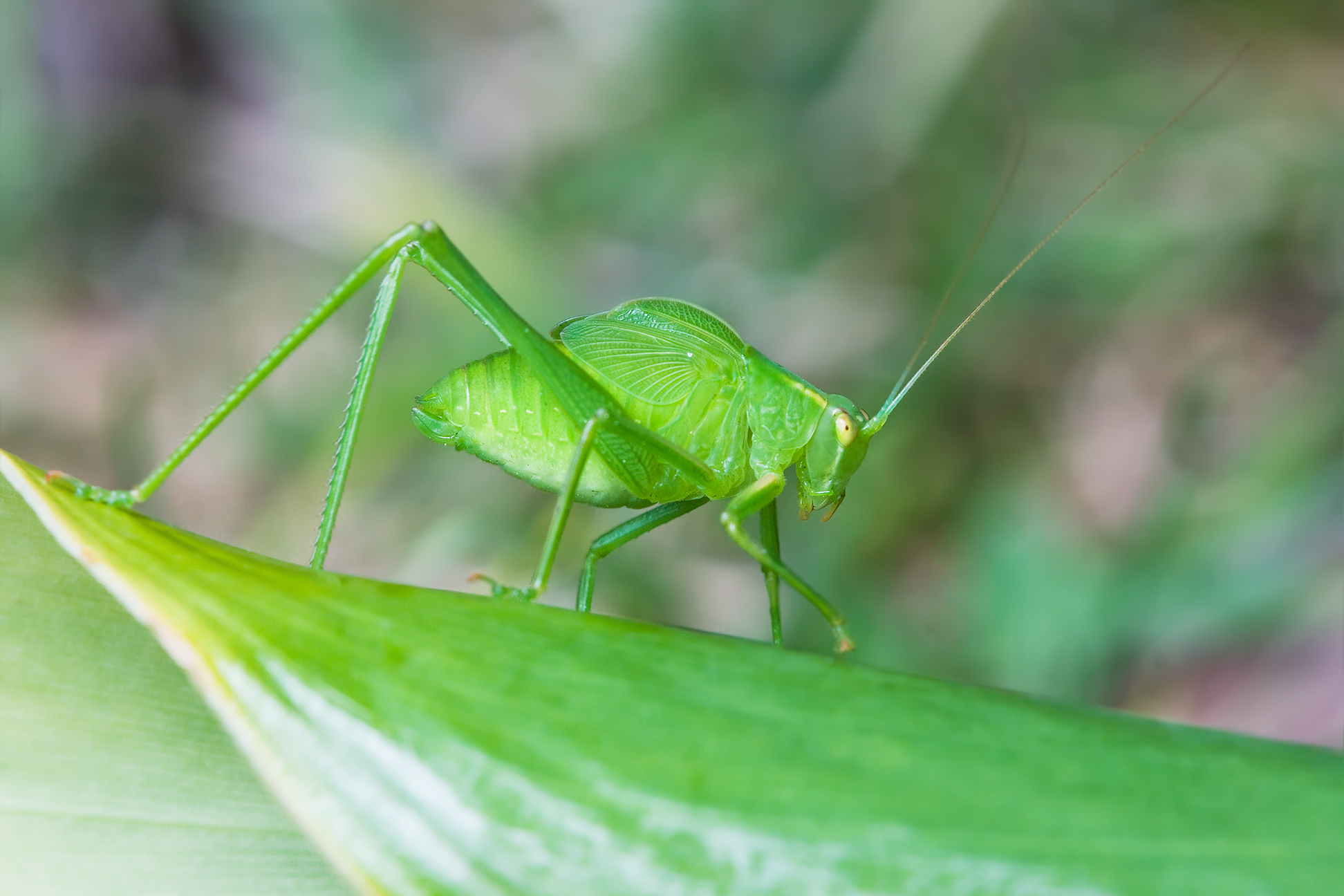

Conservation status
- Not Threatened (NZ TCS)

Scientific classification
- Kingdom: Animalia
- Phylum: Arthropoda
- Class: Insecta
- Order: Orthoptera
- Suborder: Ensifera
- Family: Tettigoniidae
- Subfamily: Phaneropterinae
- Genus: Caedicia
- Species: C. simplex

Binomial name
- Caedicia simplex Walker, 1869

= Caedicia simplex =

Species of insect

Caedicia simplex is a species of bush cricket or katydid, native to New Zealand and Australia. A common name is the "common garden katydid".

== Description ==
Species found in the family Tettigoniidae are differentiated from other ensifera by the presence of forewings that can be held away from the body modified to help with both leaf mimicry and acoustics, as well as the female ovipositor. Generally speaking, katydids have extremely long antennae in proportion to their body size, as well as a body that is cylindrical or laterally compressed with 3 sets of long, spindly legs that are used for long-distance jumping. Among all katydids, Caedicia simplex is considered an unremarkable species in appearance. The common garden katydid strongly resembles a small leaf in appearance with a grass-like, green coloration, measuring at about 4–6 cm as an adult. In the nymph stage, however, C. simplex are sometimes a vibrant red-pink color, lacking the leaf-like appearance of their adult counterparts. Caedicia simplex has a distinctly small, oval head with a velvety green appearance and bright, orange-red eyes. The velvety pronotum on common garden katydids are distinctly keeled, marked with a yellow stripe, having an anterior notched margin and a rounded posterior.

== Distribution ==
=== Natural global range ===
Caedicia simplex is a native insect to New Zealand and Australia. Their habitat is limited to that of New Zealand and Australia. While they are not Caedicia simplex it is worth noting that other species of katydid in the shared family of Tettigoniidae are present on all other continents excluding Antarctica.

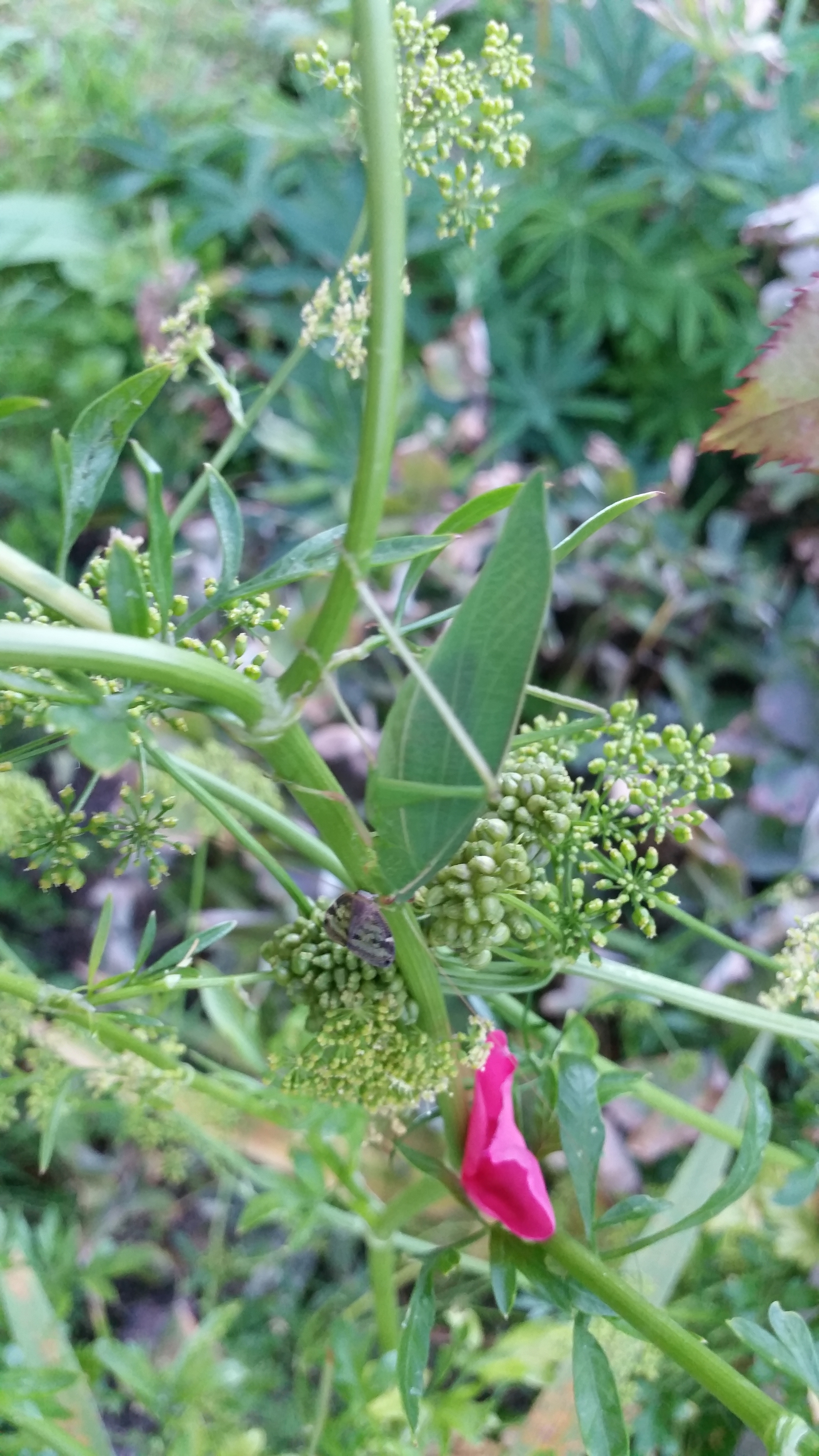
Caedicia simplex, Common garden katydid

=== New Zealand range ===
In the original description of Caedicia simplex and analysis of their distribution throughout New Zealand Walker stated that they were abundant throughout the whole of the North Island going so far south as Greymouth, NZ. Today katydids remain throughout roughly those same regions of both the North and South Islands.

=== Habitat preferences ===
Due to the massive distribution of family Tettigoniidae species the habitats can vary highly from nation to nation. Within the context of New Zealand, it is immensely common in-home gardens hence its common name as well as more forested areas. The katydid usually stays near vegetation such as shrubs and plants so that it is able to properly camouflage itself as well as maintain a source of close food/nutrients. Since they are nocturnal katydids usually only move about their vegetation habitats in the night time as this allows for the highest chance of safety and food collection.

== Life cycle/phenology ==
The life cycle of a katydid takes place over the course of about one year. The mating period for these insects is usually in the rainy season in this part of the world. Katydids engage in polygamous relationships, meaning they have more than one mate in their lifetime. Males begin the mating process by rubbing their wings together making the signature ‘katydid’ noise to attract a female mate. The louder this noise is the more a female will be able to ascertain the fitness of the male, which then decides who she mates with. A female will always choose a male with a larger spermatophore. During their encounter, the male deposits the spermatozoa into the female. Then the female uses her ovipositor to lay her eggs in the ground or stem of a nearby plant. From the egg, a nymph or juvenile katydid is born. Nymphs lacking the size, wings, and full green color of their adult counterparts must undergo numerous molts in order to reach maturity. Approximately two to three months after birth nymphs will enter their final molt, which results in the growth of wings and a realization of their full size. Full adulthood does not occur until late in the one year life of the katydid so their mating period is what becomes essential as soon as the final molt has finished. Adult katydids, after mating in the autumn months, usually die off as the colder portion of the year settles in while their eggs are waiting for spring, repeating the life cycle. These eggs are the only stage in the katydid's phenology that can withstand the winter months as they stay where they were laid until warmer spring months.

== Acoustics ==
=== Creating sound ===
It is a common misconception that katydids and other Orthopterans produce sounds by rubbing their legs together. In contrast, males produce the sound to attract females by rubbing its stridulatory file, which is on the underside of the left tegmen, against a raised vein on the underside of the right tegmen, similar to the movement of running a fingernail along a comb. Females in the family Phaneropterinae are unique in the fact that many are able to respond to the male calls by rubbing spines or pegs on their hind wings on veins on the tegmen, but this subject remains largely unstudied.

=== Hearing ===
While the subject of creating sounds is difficult to study in katydids, the subject of hearing is the most widely studied and complex component of katydid biology. The auditory system is highly evolved in katydids, as the neural network receives information from two external sources. The first, a pair of tympanic organs, each comprised to two tympanic membranes, or eardrums, are situated on the tibia of each foreleg on the katydid. The second source of auditory signals comes from auditory trachea, which are evolved from their original respiratory functions, located on the thorax. The physiology of the auditory interneurons of C. simplex has been thoroughly studied and examined by Oldfield and Hill, but requires a high knowledge of Orthoptera auditory physiology to examine.

== Diet and predators ==
=== Predators ===
Katydids and other species in Orthoptera are an important component of many vertebrate diets, such as frogs, lizards, bats, and birds, but the coloration and camouflage that C. simplex has developed and evolved to have, like many species of katydid, put them at an advantage to predators. In addition to vertebrate predators, insects that have been known to hunt and subdue katydids include tachinid flies (family Tachinidae), digger wasps (family Sphecidae), spiders, some species of ants, and many predatory insects that are larger than katydids. Large predatory insects, however, are more of an issue for Australian C. simplex residents, while New Zealand residents have a tougher time with birds. While the camouflage puts katydids at somewhat of an advantage in some respects for predation, Lysaght describes C. simplex as a “sluggish insect”, relying primarily on their appearance to stay hidden from predators.

=== Parasites ===
Gordian worms, or horsehair worms (phylum Nematomorpha) are very commonly found in the abdomen of many katydids as an internal parasite. Gordian worms are a common parasite known for manipulating its host via behavioral alteration, and in the species of one katydid, it was found that this was accomplished by the molecular mimicry of host proteins, which were linked to neurotransmitter release. In the case of many katydids, the parasite did not directly affect an individual's physiology nor wellbeing, only manipulating the behavior of the katydid at the end of the worm's life cycle, when it “directs the host to water”, where the worm emerges for a “mating frenzy”.

=== Diet ===
Species found in Tettigoniidae have a wide variety of foraging methods and diets, such as feeding on dead carcasses or other insects, feeding on pollen, and most commonly, foraging on plants. C. simplex, as well as other species in the subfamily Phaneropterinae, have been observed specifically foraging on plants, but their diet contains a wide variety of such. Primary host plants in New Zealand that have been observed are peach trees, pines, eucalypts, roses, and acacias, and three indigenous species, mahoe, beech trees in the genera Nothofagus, and manuka. Additionally, species in Phaneropterinae have been observed to prefer plants with higher protein content such as flowering species and the flowers themselves, but many are completely capable of developing at a normal rate while only consuming the green leafy matter from plants. While the common garden katydid has the capability to make a sizable impact on gardens, they are not considered an economic threat nor pest.

== Conservation status ==
Under the New Zealand Threat Classification System, this species is listed as "Not Threatened".
