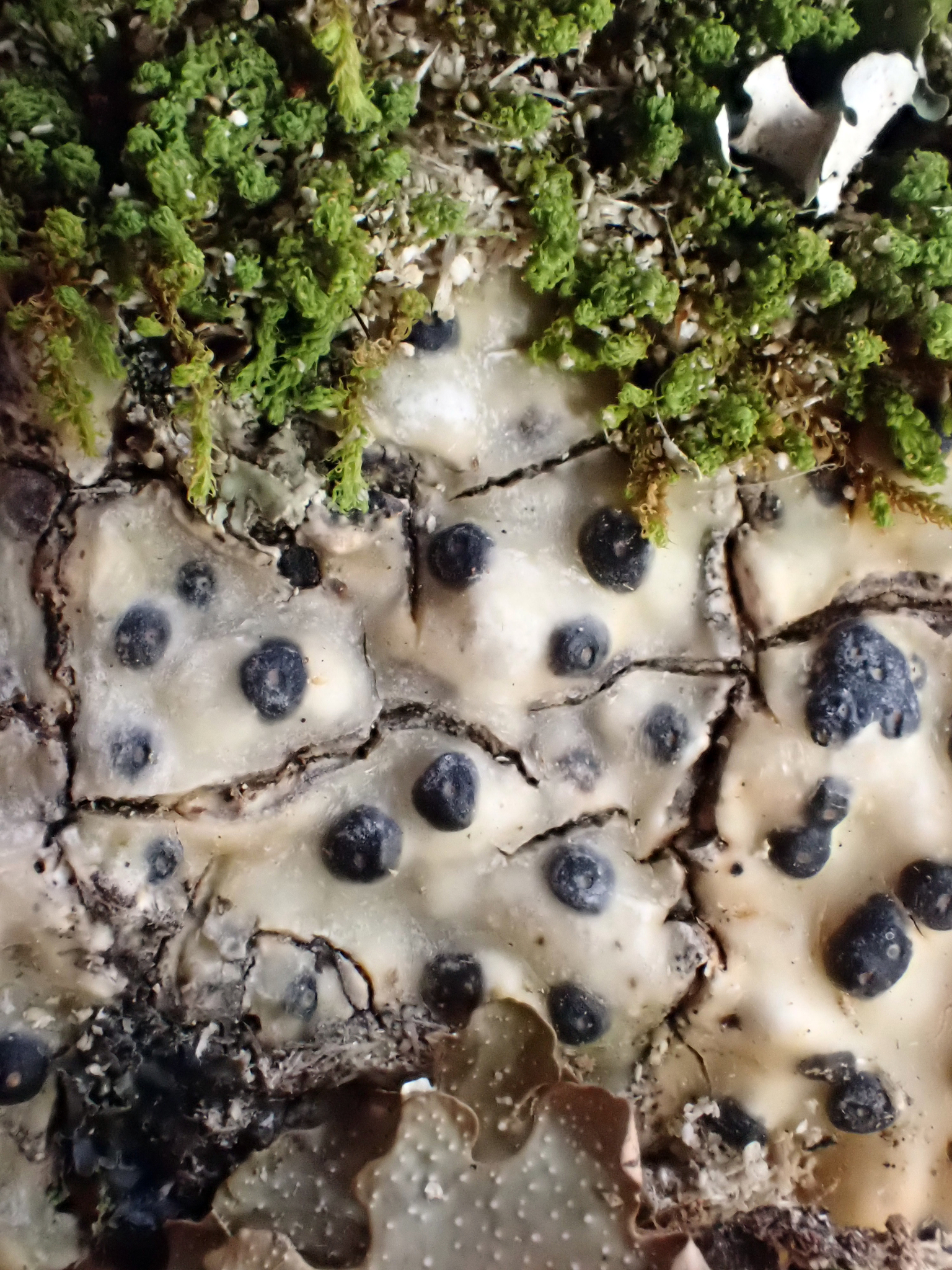
- Pyrenula subumbilicata growing on Dracophyllum arboreum in the Chatham Islands

Scientific classification
- Kingdom: Fungi
- Division: Ascomycota
- Class: Eurotiomycetes
- Order: Pyrenulales
- Family: Pyrenulaceae
- Genus: Pyrenula
- Species: P. subumbilicata

Binomial name
- Pyrenula subumbilicata (C. Knight) Aptroot

Synonyms
- Synonymy: Parmentaria subumbilicata (C.Knight) Müll.Arg.; Pyrenula immersa Müll.Arg.; Trypethelium subumbilicatum C.Knight

= Pyrenula subumbilicata =

Species of lichen

Pyrenula subumbilicata is a species of corticolous (bark-dwelling), crustose lichen in the family Pyrenulaceae. Previously thought to be endemic to Australia, it was found in New Zealand in 2014.

== Description ==
Pyrenula subumbilicata has a yellow to olive green thallus without a pseudocyphellae, and black ascomata often found in groups on two to six, with fused ostioles. It has irregularly submuriform ascospores with simple end locules.

== Taxonomy ==
The lichen was formally described as a new species by New Zealand doctor Charles Knight in 1886, who used the name Trypethelium subumbilicatum. The species was recombined in 2007 by André Aptroot, who placed it in the genus Pyrenula.

== Distribution and habitat ==
The species is found in lowland rainforests in Queensland,Australia, and was first recognised in New Zealand in 2014. In New Zealand, the species typically grows on Knightia excelsa, Pseudopanax crassifolius and Myrsine australis, and has been found in regenerating coastal forest in the Waitākere Ranges and Okura Bush Scenic Reserve in the Auckland Region, and on the Chatham Islands growing on Dracophyllum arboreum.

== Gallery ==
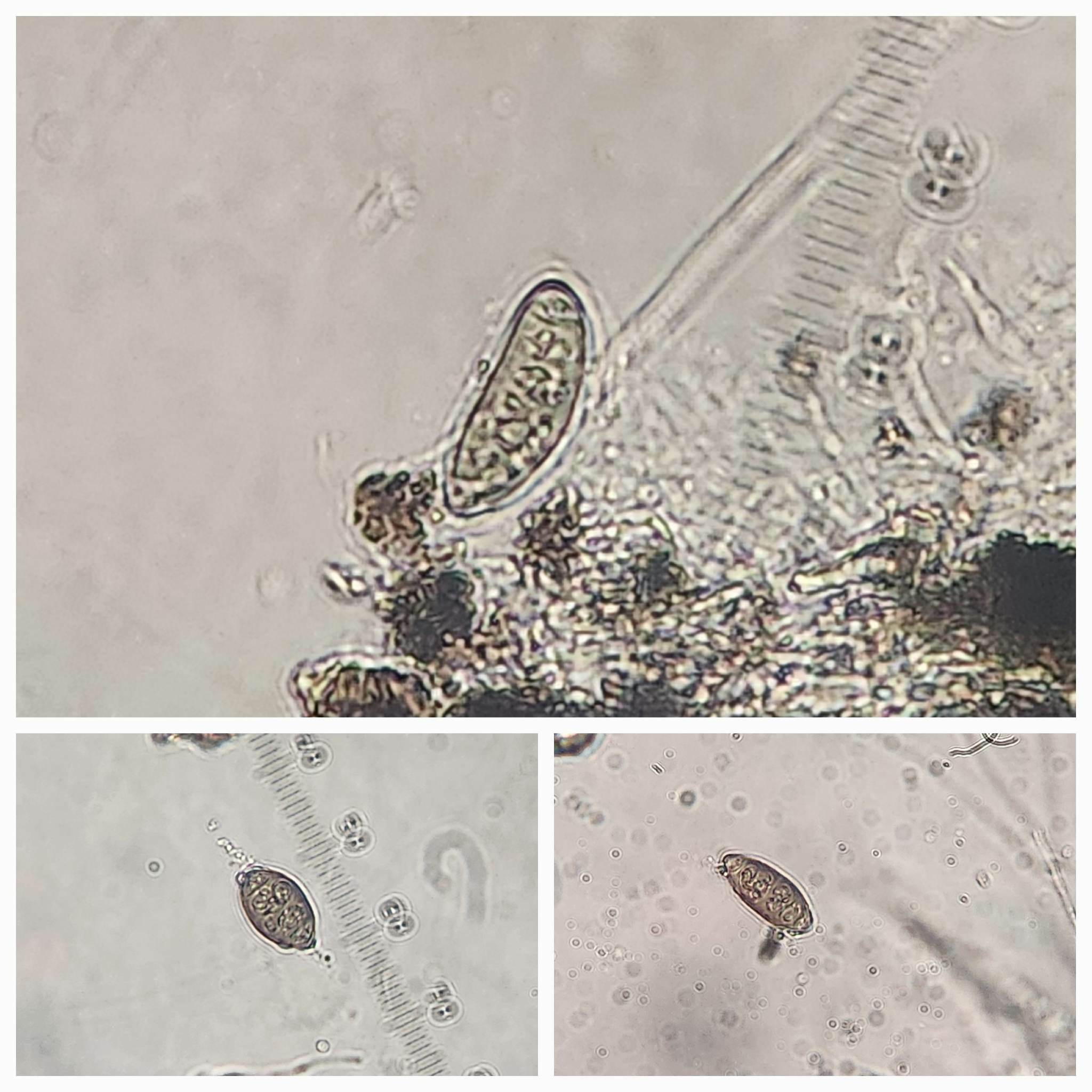

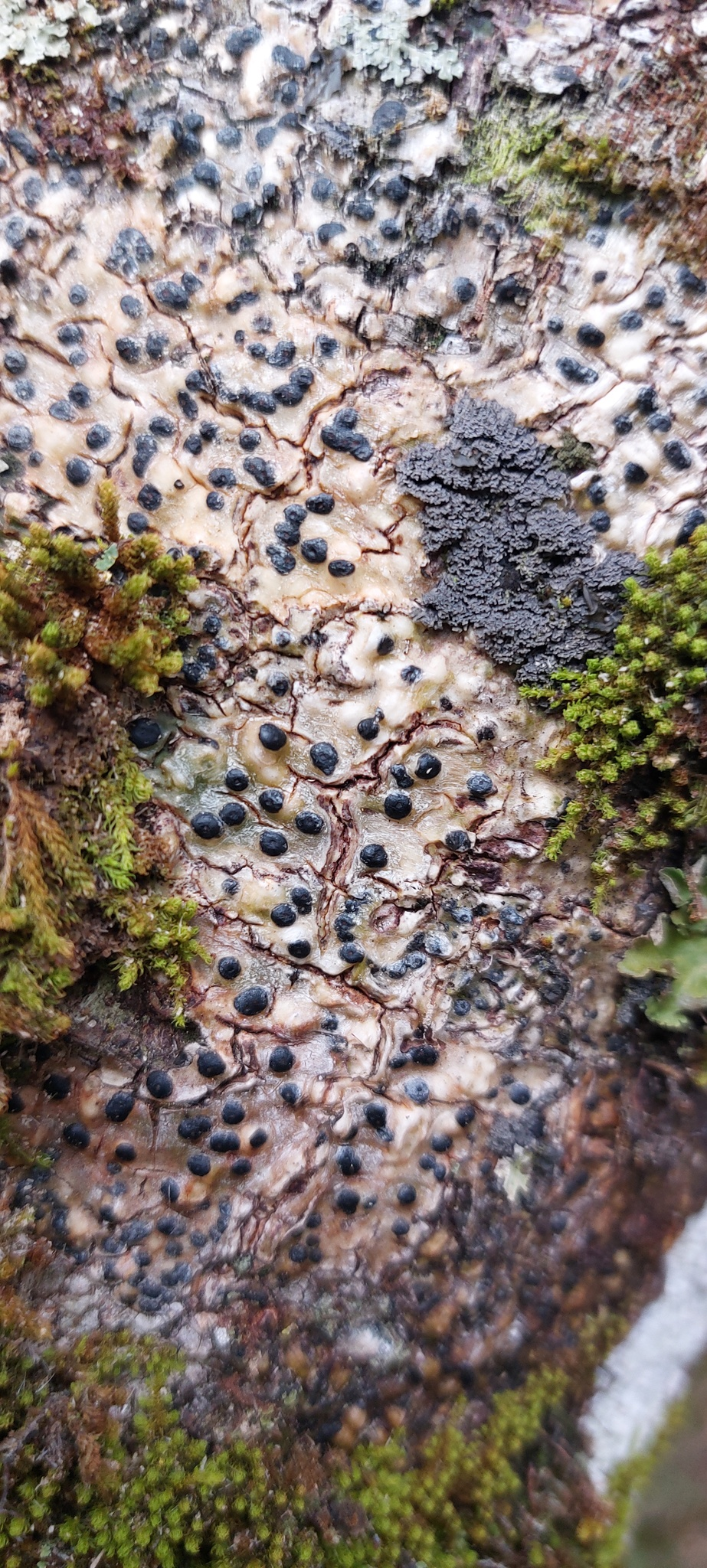

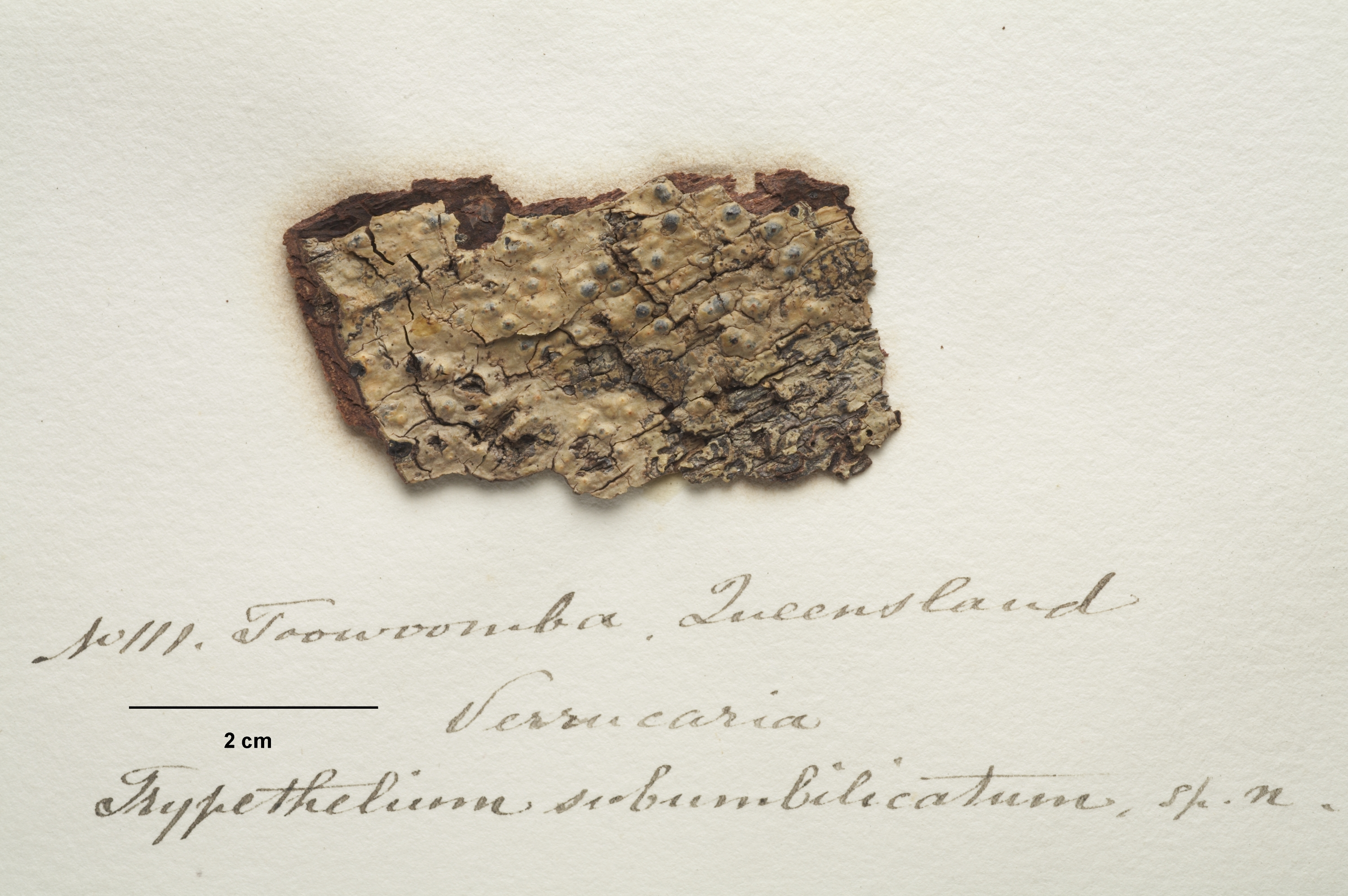
Type specimen collected from Toowoomba, Australia

== See also ==
- List of Pyrenula species
