= Colonial Bank =

Colonial Bank may refer to:

- Colonial Bank (United States)
- Colonial Bank (West Indies)
- Colonial Bank of Australasia
- Colonial Bank of Issue
- Colonial Bank of New Zealand
