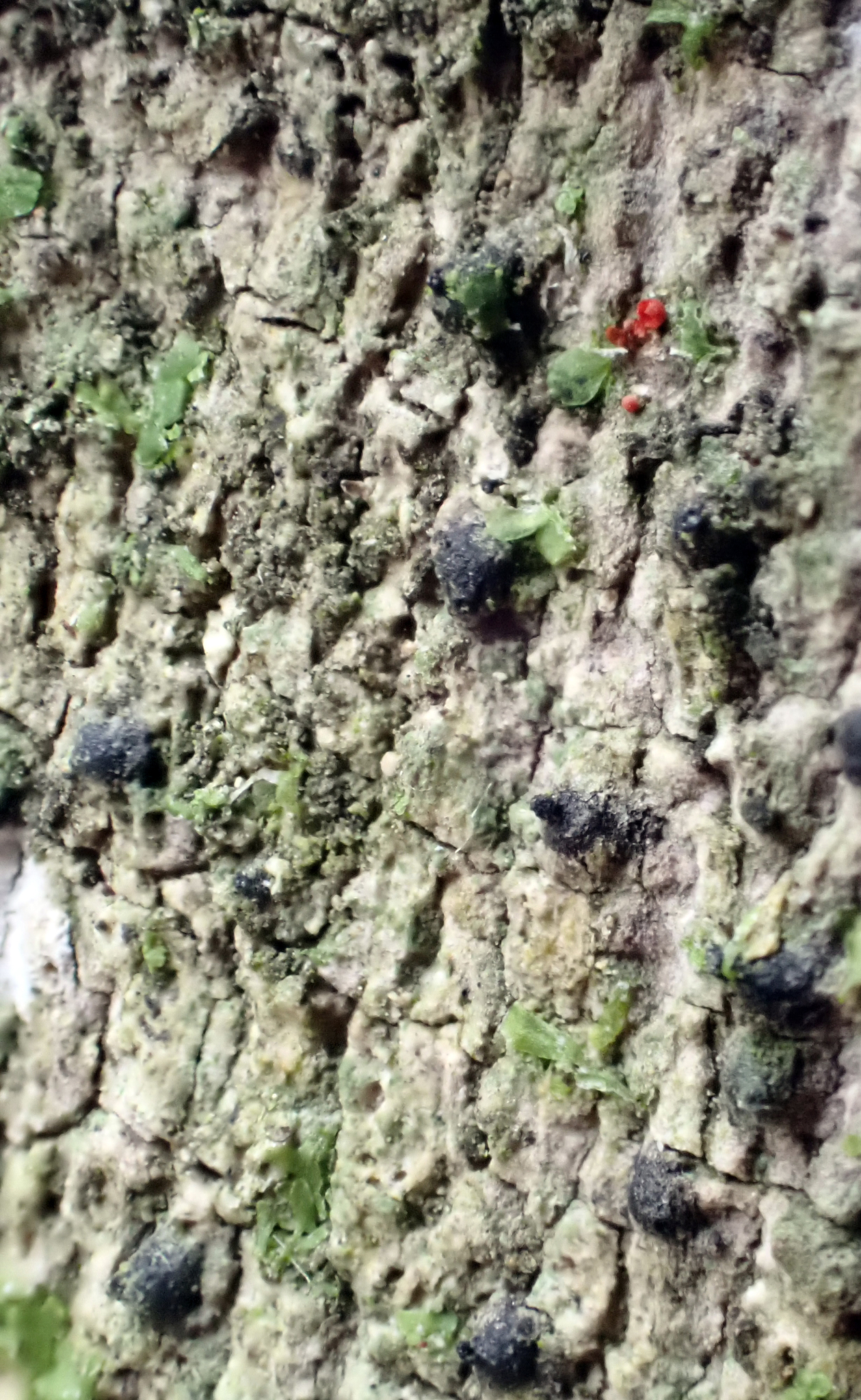

Scientific classification
- Kingdom: Fungi
- Division: Ascomycota
- Class: Eurotiomycetes
- Order: Pyrenulales
- Family: Pyrenulaceae
- Genus: Pyrenula
- Species: P. moniliformis

Binomial name
- Pyrenula moniliformis (C. Knight) Müll. Arg.

Synonyms
- Verrucaria moniliformis C. Knight

= Pyrenula moniliformis =

Species of lichen

Pyrenula moniliformis is a species of lichen in the family Pyrenulaceae, which is endemic to New Zealand. First described in 1860 by Charles Knight, no further type specimens of the lichen were found until 2025. Currently, the species is only known to occur in the Auckland Region, and grows on māhoe trees.

== Description ==
The species is corticolous, has a crustose thallus, no pseudocyphellae, and is cream to pale brown in colour. It can be distinguished from other members of Pyrenula due to having apiculate spores which are 5- to 7-septate, which range in size between 55 μm (0.0022 in) by 10 μm (0.00039 in) and 68 μm (0.0027 in) by 12.5 μm (0.00049 in).

== Taxonomy ==
The species was first described in 1860 by Charles Knight, using the name Verrucaria moniliformis. It was moved to the genus Pyrenula in 1894 by Johannes Müller Argoviensis. The species was only known from its type collection until 2025, when new specimens were discovered in the Unitec Institute of Technology herbarium, including student specimen collections dating back to 2015. After rediscovery, the species was redescribed in 2025 by Andrew J. Marshall, Peter de Lange, Dan Blanchon and André Aptroot, based on fresh specimens. The holotype is held by the British Museum, and while Knight did not specify a location, is presumed to have been collected from the Auckland Region.

== Ecology ==
The species tends to grows in shaded early-stage successional forest dominated by māhoe trees either as a canopy or subcanopy.

== Distribution and habitat ==
The species is endemic to New Zealand, living exclusively on the bark of māhoe trees. While currently only known from the Auckland Region, however Marshall et al. suggest the species is likely found in other regions outside of Auckland. Specimens have been found at eight different sites across central, west and south Auckland.
