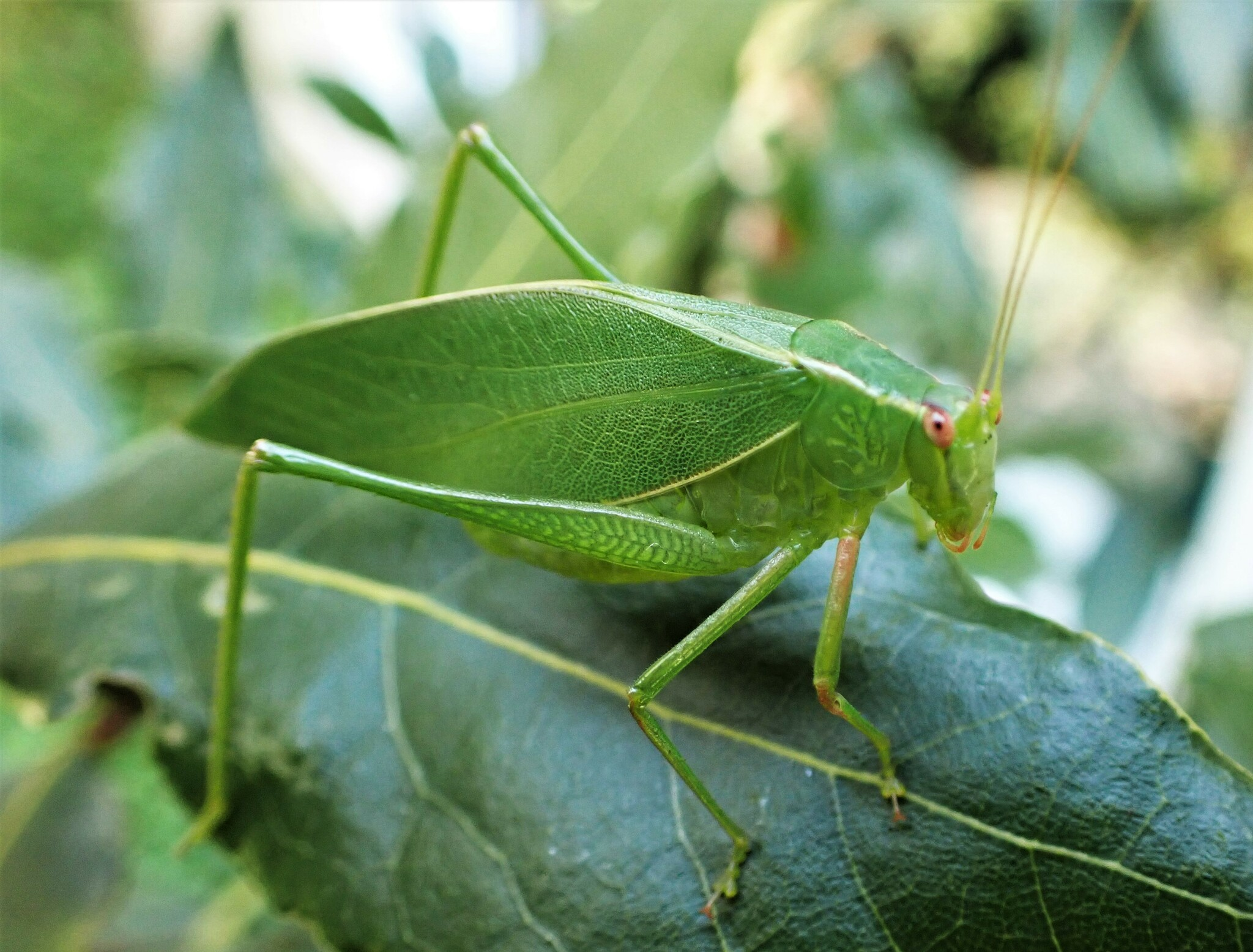
- Caedicia simplex

Scientific classification
- Kingdom: Animalia
- Phylum: Arthropoda
- Clade: Pancrustacea
- Class: Insecta
- Order: Orthoptera
- Suborder: Ensifera
- Superfamily: Tettigonioidea
- Family: Tettigoniidae
- Subfamily: Phaneropterinae
- Tribe: Ephippitythini
- Genus: Caedicia; Stål, 1874

= Caedicia =

Genus of cricket-like animals

Caedicia is a genus of bush crickets or katydids in the subfamily Phaneropterinae and tribe Ephippitythini. Species can be found mostly in the Australasian realm (New Guinea and Australia), with records from Vietnam (Caedicia thymifolia).

== Species ==
The Orthoptera Species File lists:

1. Caedicia acutifolia Brunner von Wattenwyl, 1878
2. Caedicia affinis Bolívar, 1902
3. Caedicia albidiceps Walker, 1869
4. Caedicia araucariae Rentz, 1988
5. Caedicia bispinulosa Brunner von Wattenwyl, 1878
6. Caedicia chloronota Bolívar, 1902
7. Caedicia chyzeri Bolívar, 1902
8. Caedicia clavata Bolívar, 1902
9. Caedicia concisa Brunner von Wattenwyl, 1878
10. Caedicia congrua Walker, 1869
11. Caedicia extenuata Walker, 1869
12. Caedicia flexuosa Bolívar, 1902
13. Caedicia gloriosa Hebard, 1922
14. Caedicia goobita Rentz, Su & Ueshima, 2008
15. Caedicia gracilis Rentz, 1988
16. Caedicia halmaturina Tepper, 1892
17. Caedicia hirsuta Tepper, 1892
18. Caedicia inermis Brunner von Wattenwyl, 1878
19. Caedicia kuranda Rentz, Su & Ueshima, 2008
20. Caedicia longipennis Brunner von Wattenwyl, 1878
21. Caedicia longipennoides Tepper, 1892
22. Caedicia marginata Brunner von Wattenwyl, 1878
23. Caedicia mesochides Rentz, 1988
24. Caedicia minor Brunner von Wattenwyl, 1878
25. Caedicia noctivaga Rentz, 1988
26. Caedicia obtusifolia Brunner von Wattenwyl, 1878
27. Caedicia paraopeba Piza, 1980
28. Caedicia pictipes Stål, 1874
  - Type species (from Queensland)
29. Caedicia porrecta Brunner von Wattenwyl, 1879
30. Caedicia punctifera Walker, 1871
31. Caedicia scalaris Brunner von Wattenwyl, 1878
32. Caedicia septentrionalis Brunner von Wattenwyl, 1878
33. Caedicia simplex Walker, 1869
34. Caedicia strenua Walker, 1869
35. Caedicia thymifolia (Fabricius, 1775)
36. Caedicia valida Walker, 1869
37. Caedicia webberi Rentz, Su & Ueshima, 2008

== Gallery ==
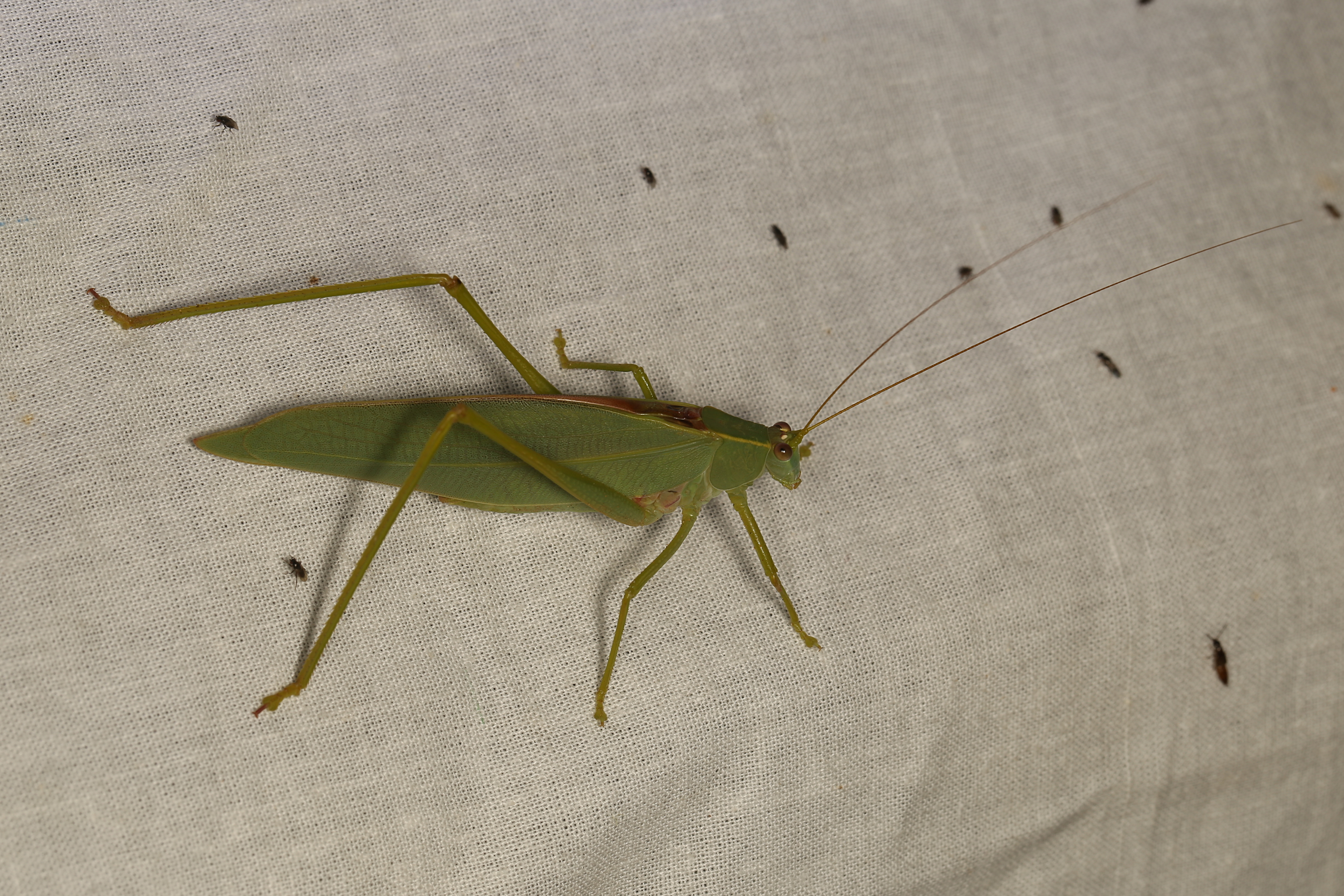
Caedicia simplex

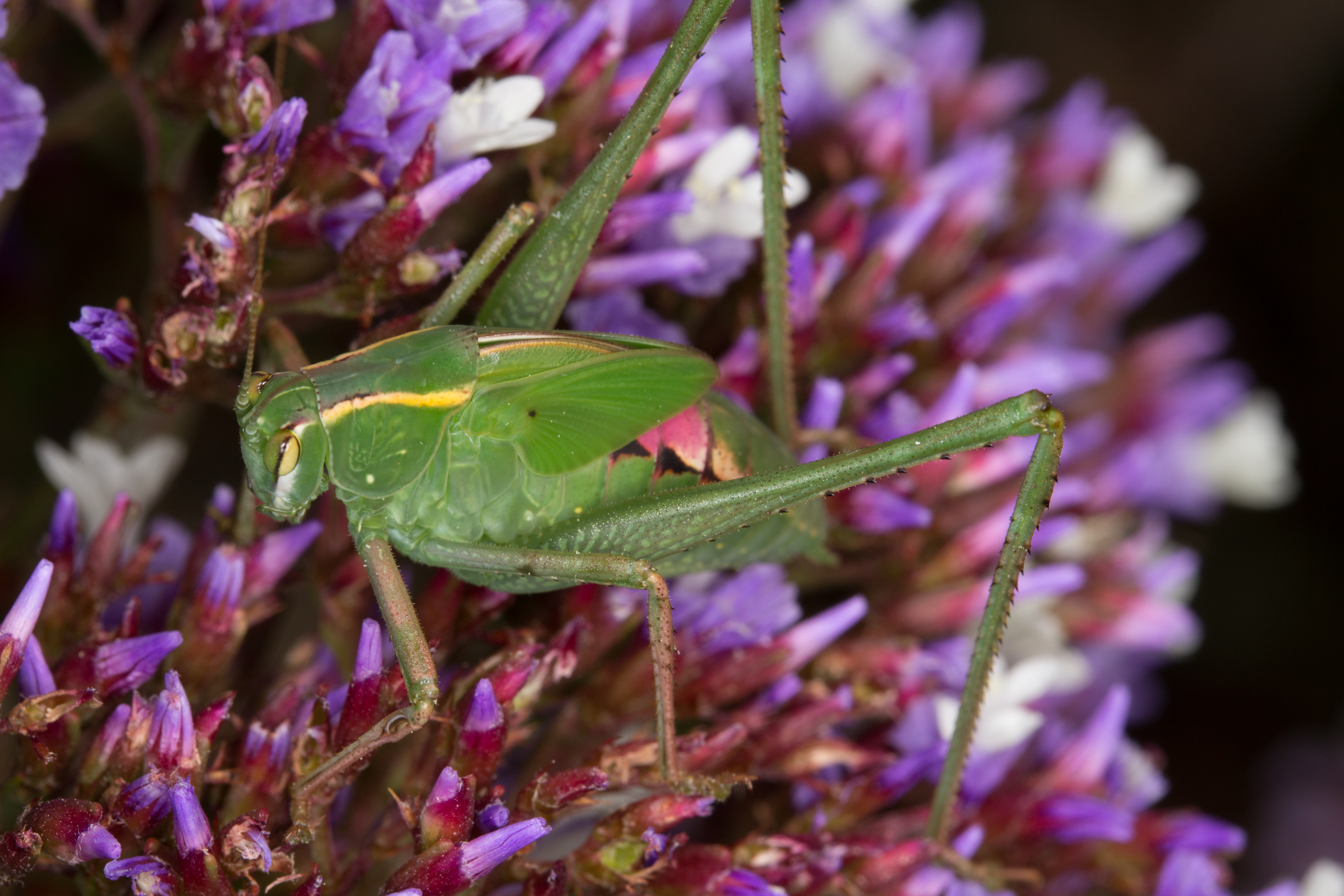
Unidentified nymph (from Brisbane)
