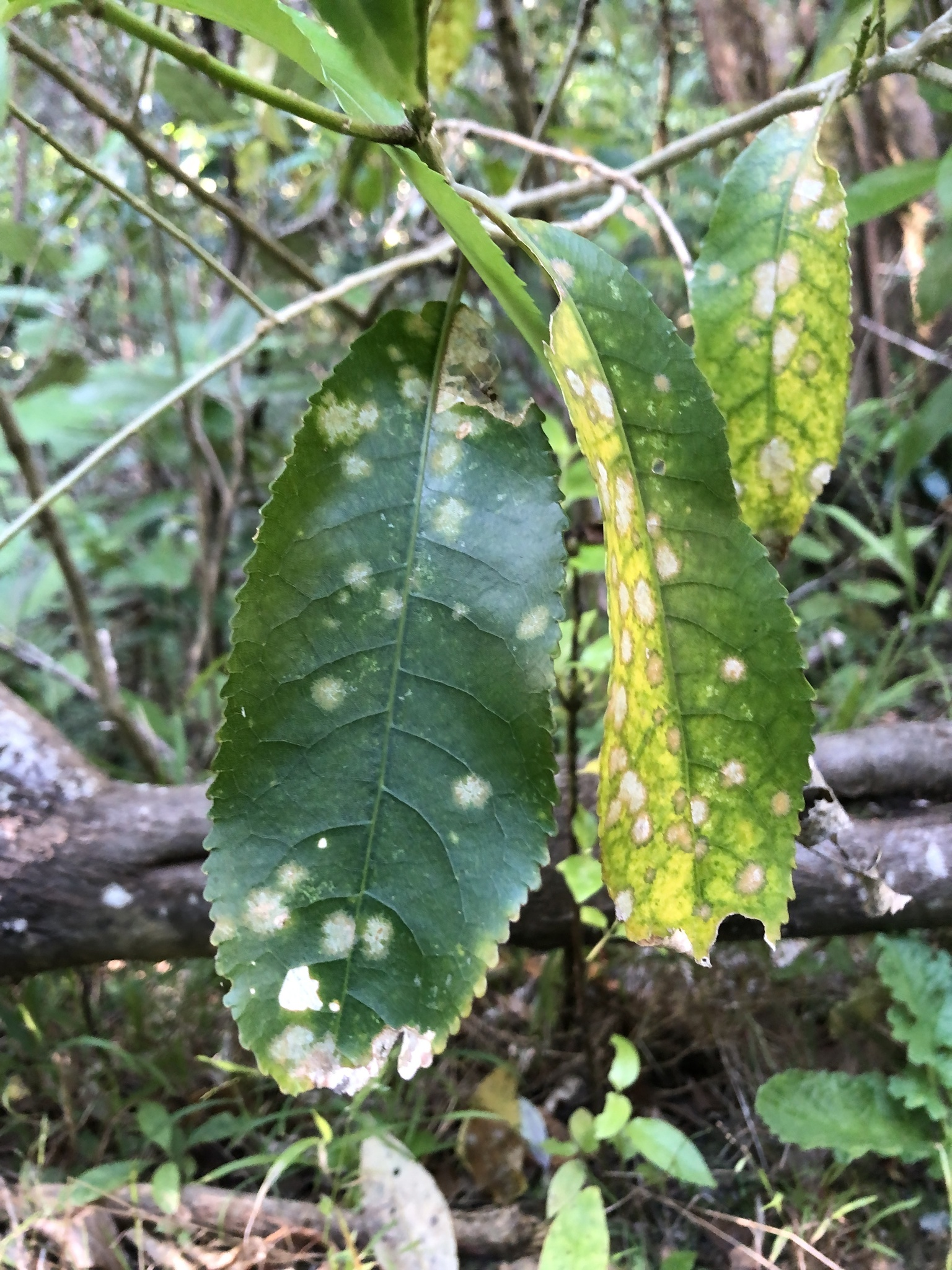
- Cephaleuros lagerheimii in Wellington

Scientific classification
- Kingdom: Plantae
- Division: Chlorophyta
- Class: Ulvophyceae
- Order: Trentepohliales
- Family: Trentepohliaceae
- Genus: Cephaleuros
- Species: C. lagerheimii

Binomial name
- Cephaleuros lagerheimii Schmidle, 1897

= Cephaleuros lagerheimii =

Species of alga

Cephaleuros lagerheimii is a species of alga, native to New Zealand, China, and South America. The type locality is Ecuador, where it was described associated with Rubiaceae. In New Zealand, it is known to use māhoe trees as a host, including Melicytus ramiflorus. The species was named for Gustaf Lagerheim.

The blotches are gray underneath and yellow brown, with yellow margins.
