= Liriomyza flavolateralis =

- Leaf mines of Liriomyza flavolateralis in Melicytus ramiflorus leaf

Scientific classification
- Kingdom: Animalia
- Phylum: Arthropoda
- Clade: Pancrustacea
- Class: Insecta
- Order: Diptera
- Family: Agromyzidae
- Genus: Liriomyza
- Species: L. flavolateralis

Binomial name
- Liriomyza flavolateralis (Watt, 1923)

Species of fly

Liriomyza flavolateralis is a species of leaf-miner fly endemic to New Zealand. As larvae, it feeds on the leaf of māhoe (Melicytus ramiflorus), creating distinctive markings on the surface of the leaf.
