= Colonial Bank of Issue =

Bank in New Zealand

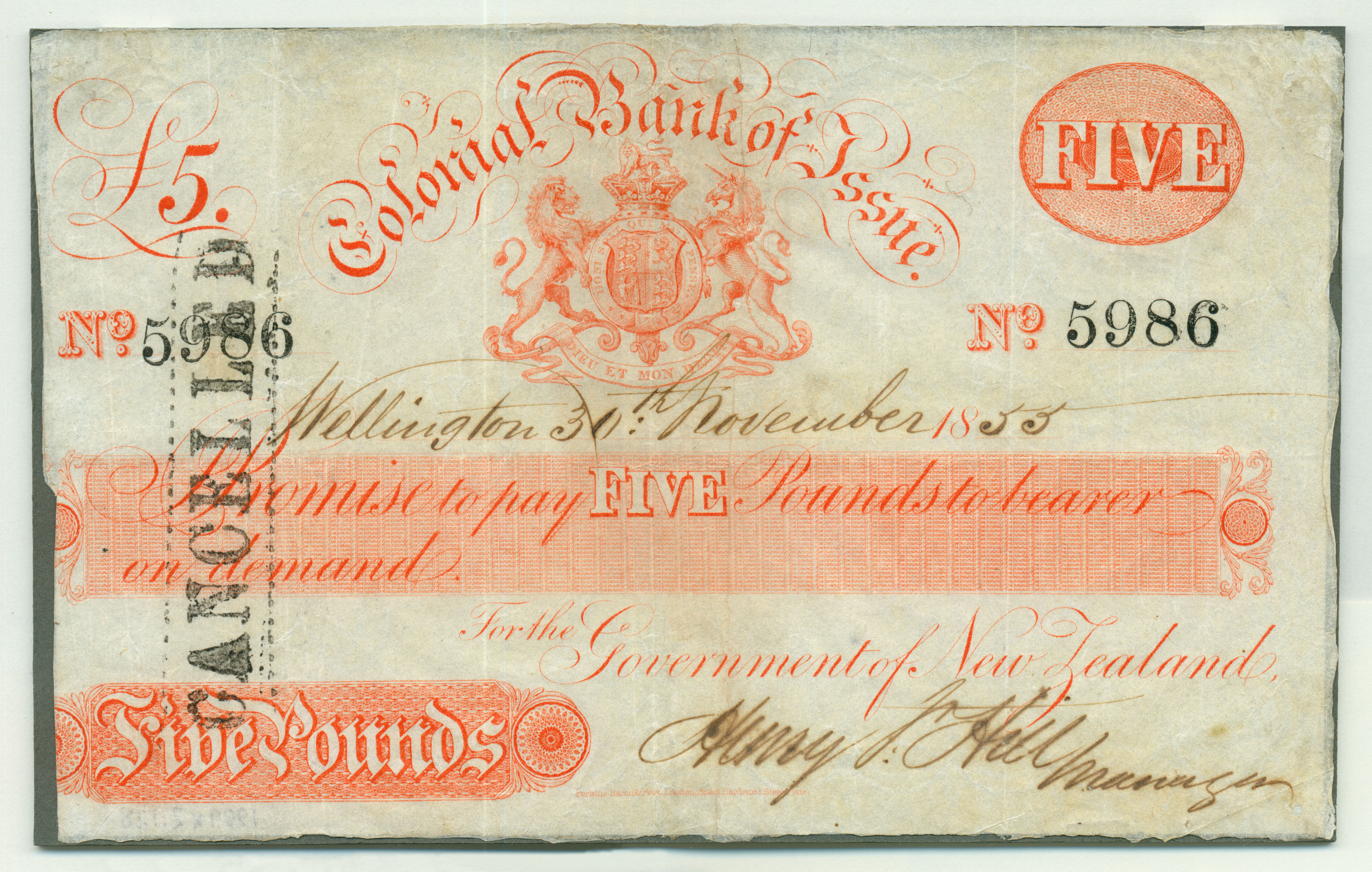
Five pound note issued at Wellington 30 November 1855

The Colonial Bank of Issue was a New Zealand state owned bank that operated between 1847 and 1856 in an early unsuccessful attempt to create a government-owned issuer of bank notes in New Zealand. The bank was created by an Ordinance of the Governor of New Zealand, Sir George Grey. Its first manager was Charles Knight.

Pressure from the newly formed Colonial Parliament, the Union Bank of Australasia, and the local commercial sector, along with views developed in the Colonial Office in the United Kingdom to allow experimentation on competition in the issue of banknotes, led to the bank being wound up by the New Zealand Colonial Bank of Issue Winding-Up Act 1856.
