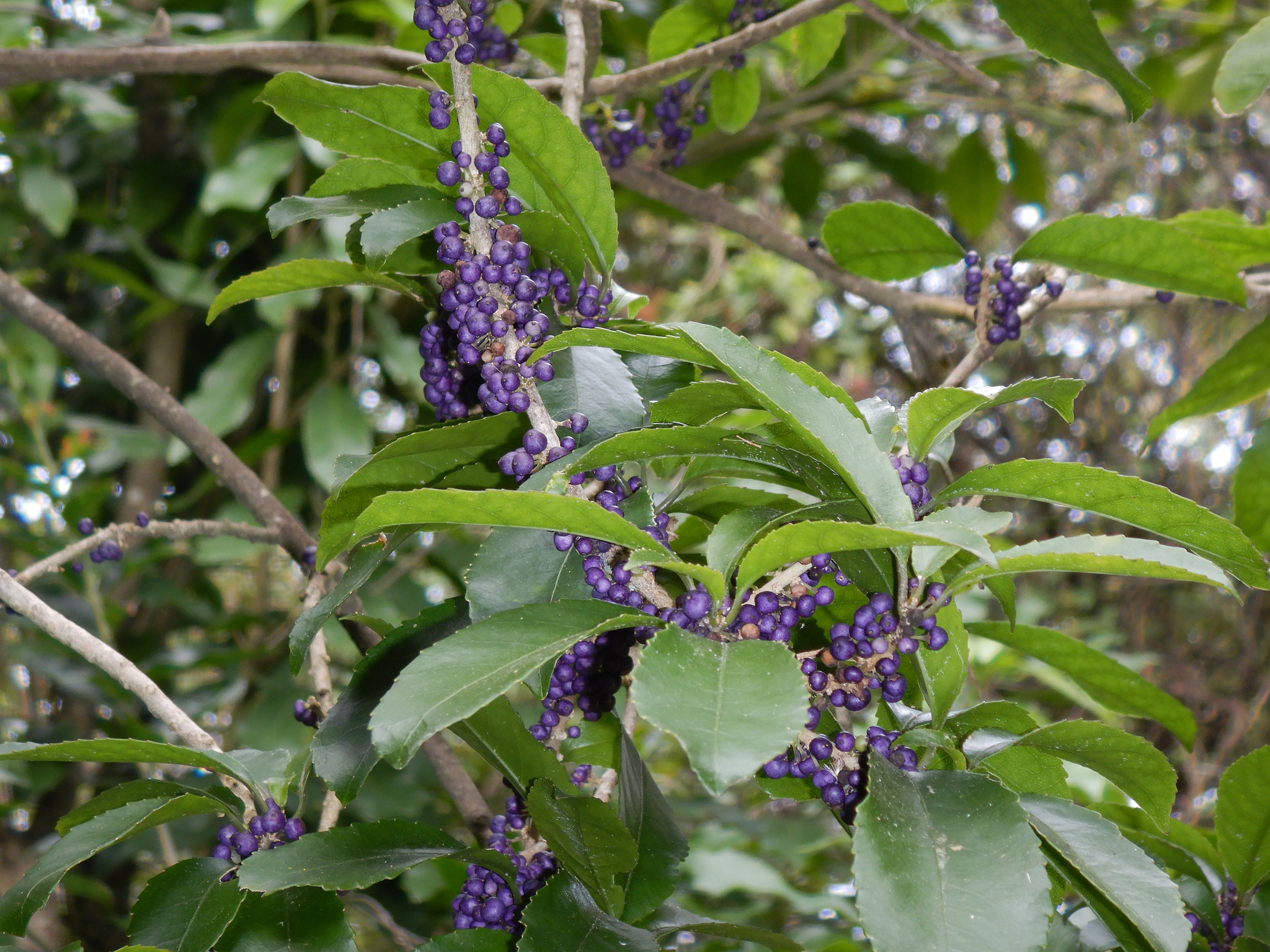
- Leaves and purple berries of M. ramiflorus

Conservation status
- Not Threatened (NZ TCS)

Scientific classification
- Kingdom: Plantae
- Clade: Tracheophytes
- Clade: Angiosperms
- Clade: Eudicots
- Clade: Rosids
- Order: Malpighiales
- Family: Violaceae
- Genus: Melicytus
- Species: M. ramiflorus

Binomial name
- Melicytus ramiflorus J.R.Forst & G.Forst.

= Melicytus ramiflorus =

Species of flowering plant

Melicytus ramiflorus, commonly known as māhoe, hinahina, and whiteywood, is a species of shrub or small tree in the family Violaceae. This species is characterised by its flowers and purple fruits, which grow directly from woody stems, a trait known as ramiflory. A distinct feature of this plant are the skeletonised leaves on the leaf litter, where the leaves retain their veins even after the rest of the tissue has decayed. There are two recognised subspecies of this plant: M. ramiflorus subsp. ramiflorus endemic to New Zealand, and subsp. oblongifolius endemic to Norfolk Island.

The plant was first described by the German naturalists Georg and Johann Reinhold Forster in 1776. M. ramiflorus is pollinated by insects, and its seeds are later dispersed by fruit-eating animals (frugivores), such as birds and lizards. M. ramiflorus had some traditional and medicinal uses for the indigenous Māori people. M. ramiflorus has been suspected to contain toxins that are poisonous to cattle. M. ramiflorus's 2023 assessment in the New Zealand Threat Classification System was "Not Threatened".

== Description ==
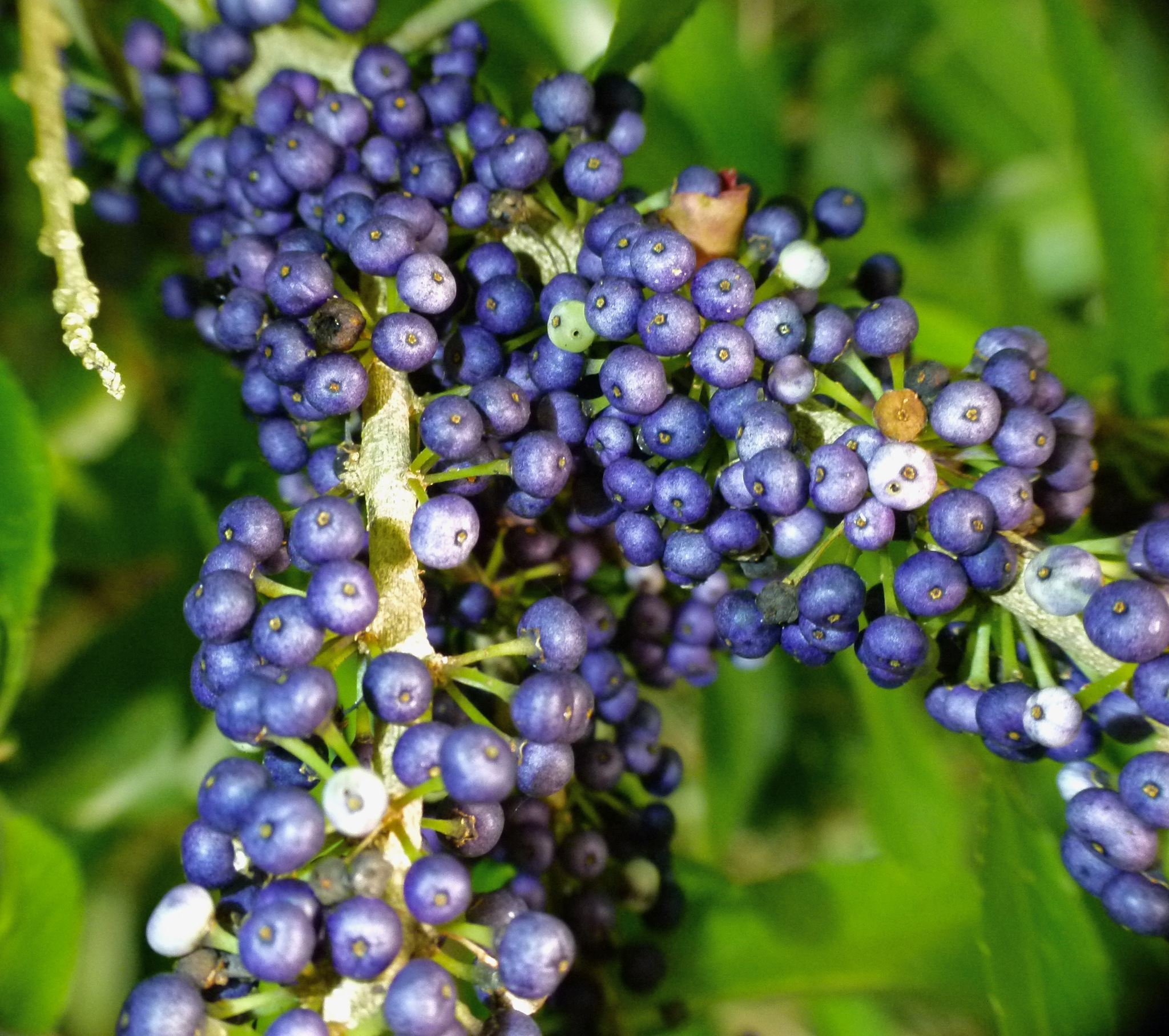
Purple-violet berries

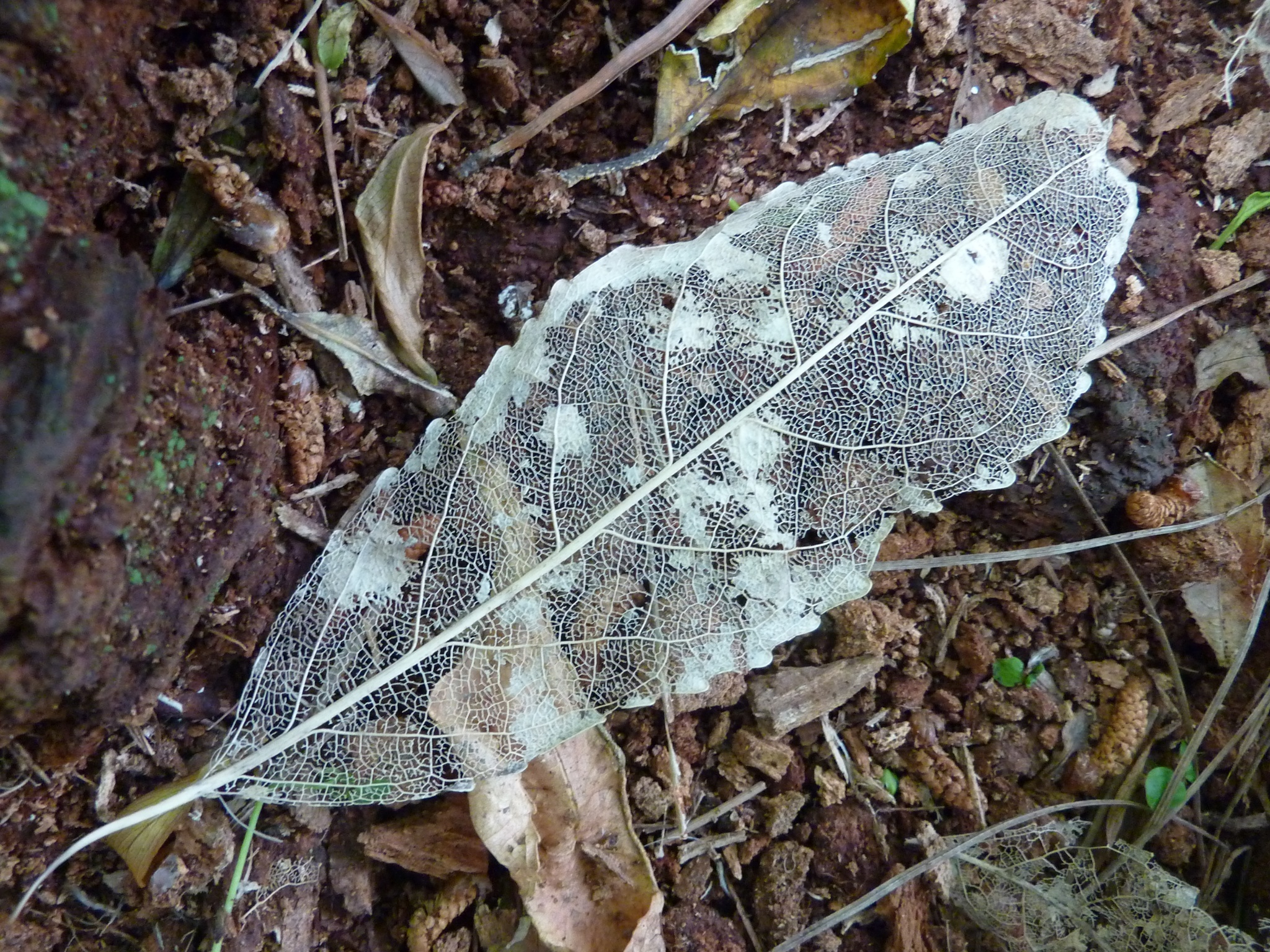
A skeletonised leaf on the forest floor

Melicytus ramiflorus is a shrub or small tree in the family Violaceae. It reaches 15 metres (49 feet) in height, with a trunk reaching 0.6–0.8 m (2 ft 0 in – 2 ft 7 in) in diameter, typically branched from near the base. The bark is greyish-white in colour, while the underside is bright green. The wood is soft, pale-brown or white-coloured, and brittle.

Leaves are thick and fleshy. They are 50 mm–150 mm × 30 mm–50 mm (2.0 in–5.9 in × 1.2 in–2.0 in) long, light to dark green in colour, narrow to oval-shaped; tips are pointed to long-pointed, or rarely blunt in character. The margins are coarsely serrated, rarely nearly smooth or irregularly toothed. They are arranged in an alternating pattern. A distinct feature of M. ramiflorus are the skeletonised leaves on the leaf litter, where the leaves retain their veins even after the rest of the tissue has decayed.

Melicytus ramiflorus is characterised by its flowers and purple fruits, which grow directly from the woody stems, a trait known as ramiflory. Flowering occurs from November to February. The inflorescences (flower clusters) grow either from the stems directly or at the end of them. Each flower is 3–4 mm in diameter. They are dioecious, meaning male and female flowers are on separate plants. The pedicels are 5–10 mm long. The petals are typically greenish-yellow in colour. Fruits are found in berries which are violet, dark blue or purple in colour, 4–5 mm in diameter, ovoid-like to globe-shaped in character. Fruiting occurs from November to March. There are three–six, potentially ten, seeds per berry. M. ramiflorus has a diploid chromosome count of 32.

== Taxonomy ==
The plant was first described by the German naturalists Georg and Johann Reinhold Forster in 1776. There are nineteen species of the Melicytus genus currently accepted by the Plants of the World Online taxonomic database. These species are native to Australia and several islands in the Pacific. M. ramiflorus is the type species of the genus Melicytus. Mitchell et al. (2009) suggested that Melicytus first diverged in New Zealand, and then diverged elsewhere.

Historic classifications identified four subspecies within M. ramiflorus, including subsp. oblongifolius from Norfolk Island, subsp. fastigiata from Fiji, and subsp. samoensis from Samoa. Art Whistler argues that each of these should be treated as separate species rather than subspecies. The New Zealand Plant Conservation Network followed that opinion.

The Plants of the World Online taxonomic database recognises two subspecies of Melicytus ramiflorus:

- Melicytus ramiflorus subsp. ramiflorus — native to mainland New Zealand and the Kermadec Islands
- Melicytus ramiflorus subsp. oblongifolius — native to the Norfolk Islands

=== Etymology ===
The etymology (word origin) of the genus name, Melicytus, is uncertain, but is possibly derived from the Greek words μєλι (meli), meaning 'honey', and κuτος (kytos), meaning 'hollow container', literally meaning 'honey-cave'. The specific epithet (second part of the scientific name), ramiflorus, means 'branch-flowering', from the Latin ramus, meaning 'branch', and flos meaning 'flower'. The species is commonly known as māhoe, hinahina, and whiteywood. In older sources, the plant is sometimes called cowleaf or cowtree, referring to the plant being used as fodder given to livestock.

== Ecology ==
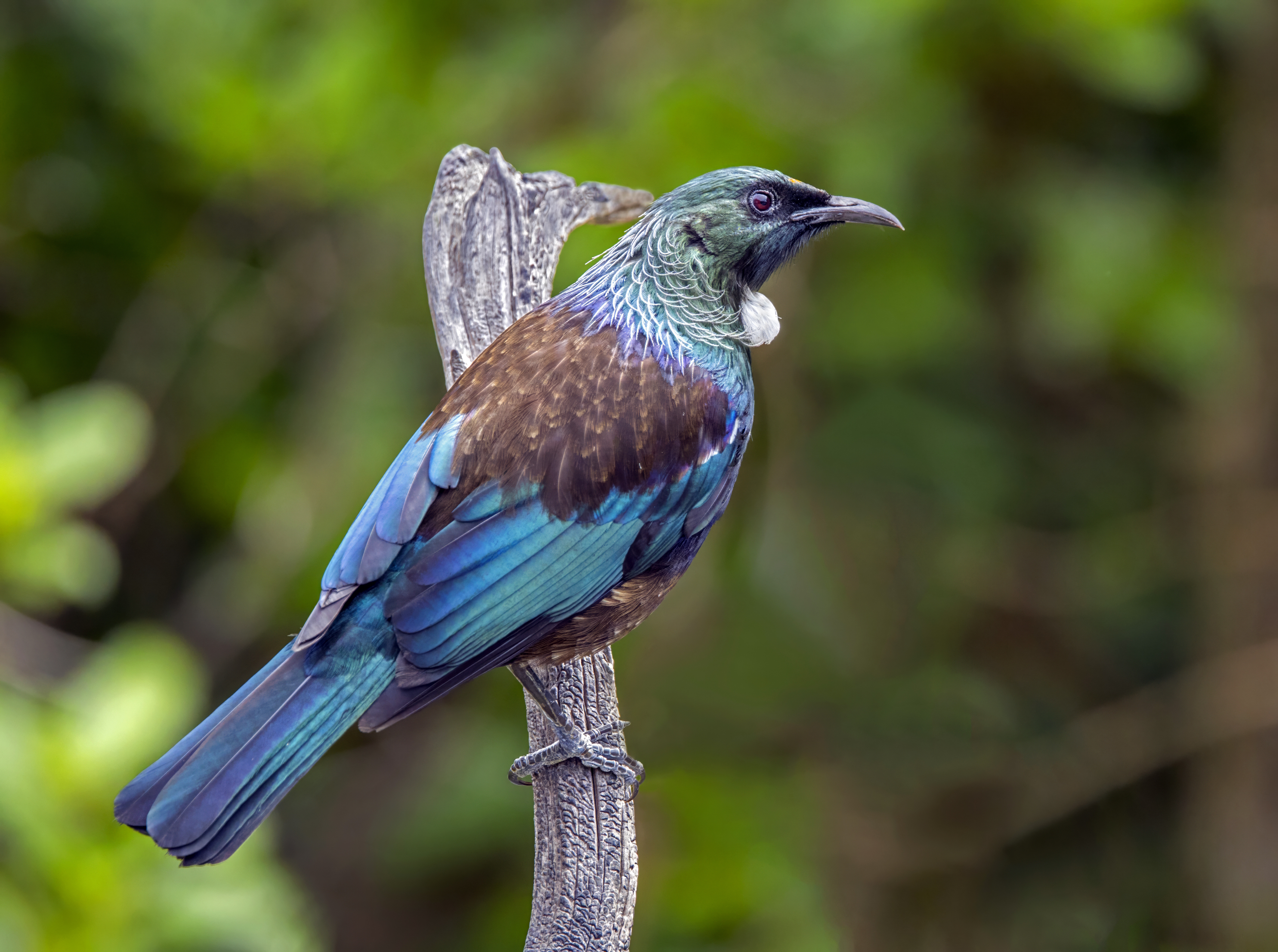
The native bird, tūī, has been recorded as a disperser of M. ramiflorus's fruits

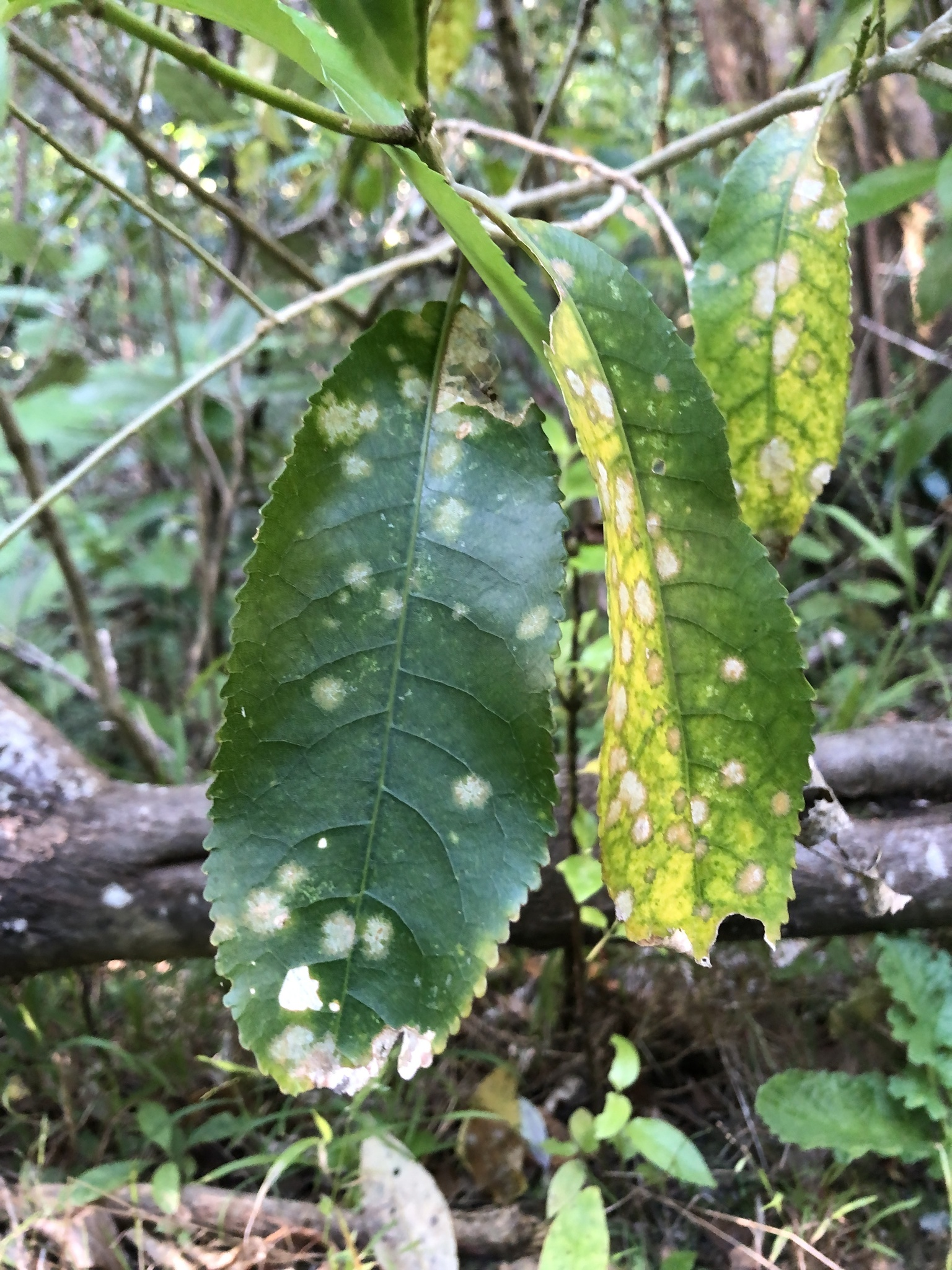
Cephaleuros lagerheimii on M. ramiflorus

Melicytus ramiflorus's seeds are dispersed by fruit-eating animals (frugivores), such as birds and lizards. M. ramiflorus is pollinated by insects, although the nectar may be collected by bees, birds, flies, and thrips. Burrows (1995) recorded M. ramiflorus's fruits are eaten by kererū (Hemiphaga novaeseelandiae), New Zealand bellbirds (Anthornis melanura), common blackbirds (Turdus merula), and silvereyes (Zosterops lateralis). Several other birds have been recorded eating the fruits, such as, tūī (Prosthemadera novaeseelandiae), kōkako (Callaeas sp.), whiteheads (Mohoua albicilla), and kākāriki (Cyanoramphus sp.). Deer, cattle, goats, horses, and possums eat the leaves.

Several beetles and insects feed on the plant, including the lemon tree borer (Oemona hirta), the sharp-tipped bell moth (Epalxiphora axenana), and Liriomyza flavolateralis. The tunnelling by insect larvae can then be inhabited by wētā. Powlesland (1984) studied the reproductive biology of three New Zealand Melicytus species and their floral visitors. M. ramiflorus's flowers were primarily visited by the native bluebottle (Calliphora quadrimaculata), a fly species. A species of ear fungus, Auricularia cornea, is often found on the trunks. The lichen Pyrenula moniliformis is only known to grow on M. ramiflorus trees located in the Auckland Region. A species of algal pathogen, Cephaleuros lagerheimii, can be found on M. ramiflorus.

Melicytus ramiflorus has low to moderate flammability rates, according to Wyse et al. (2016). Dawson & Lucas (2011) states that, during flowering, M. ramiflorus can be semideciduous, meaning they partially lose their leaves during a period of time. Leaf loss can also be caused by the māhoe moth (Feredayia graminosa). M. ramiflorus has been suspected in causing deaths in cattle. Aston (1923) mentioned a veterinarian reported the branches and leaves may cause poisonings, but did not specify a toxin responsible for this. There have not been any other records of the plant being poisonous.

== Distribution ==
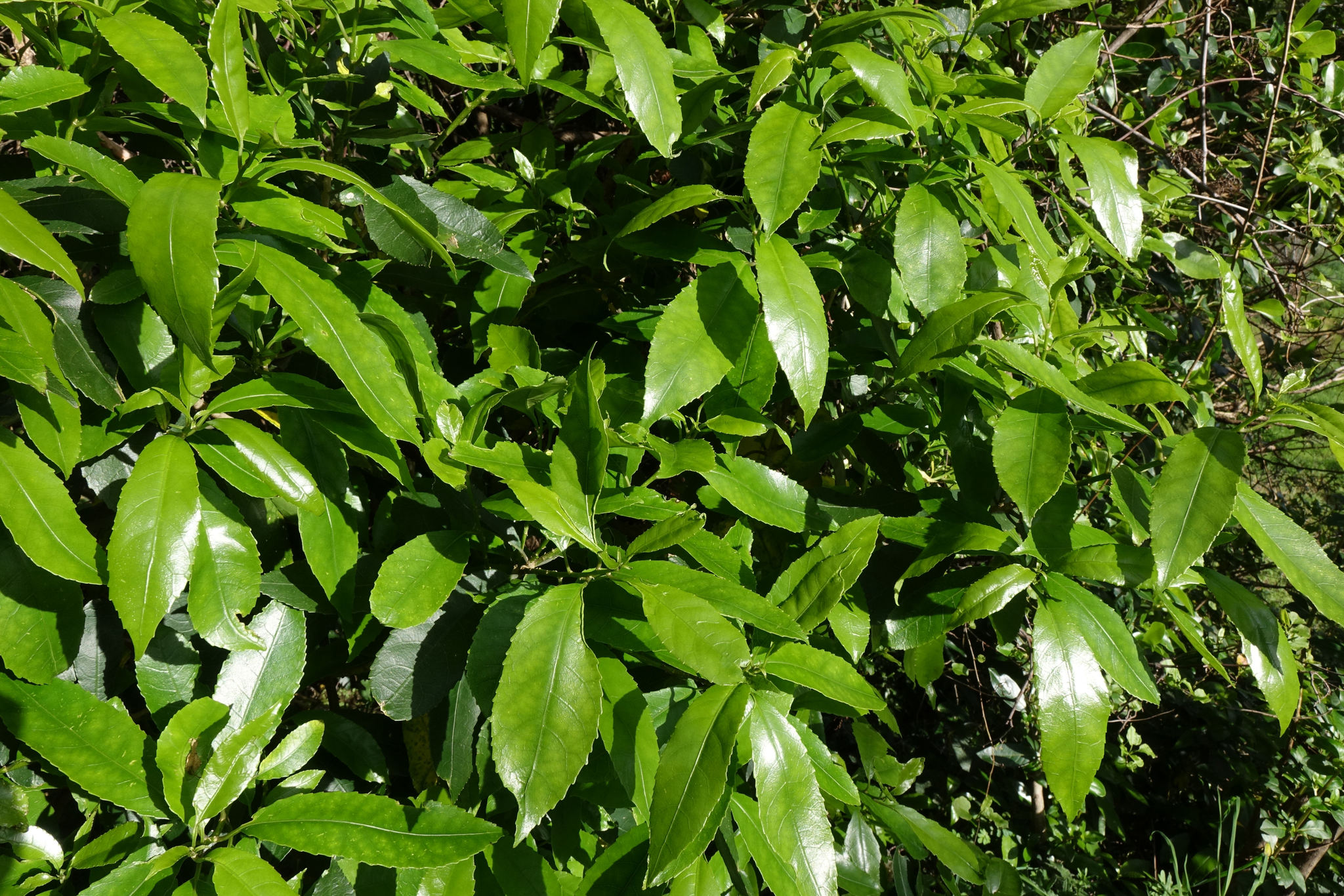
Melicytus ramiflorus growing on the Banks Peninsula

Melicytus ramiflorus subsp. ramiflorus is endemic to New Zealand, M. ramiflorus subsp. oblongifolius is endemic to the Norfolk Islands. M. ramiflorus is found throughout the North and South Islands, although its present on Stewart Island is rare. The New Zealand botanist Donald Petrie reported its presence there. The New Zealand botanist Thomas Kirk stated in his 1889 revision of the New Zealand flora that the species is "evidently rare in that locality". Dawson & Lucas (2011) mentions it is found there, however Crowe (2009) does not mention it. M. ramiflorus subsp. ramiflorus's 2023 assessment in the New Zealand Threat Classification System was "Not Threatened".

=== Habitat ===
Melicytus ramiflorus commonly inhabits lowland to lower montane envrionments. It is often found in mixed angiosperm-podocarp forests, reaching 850–1,000 m (2,790–3,280 ft) above sea level at maximum elevation. M. ramiflorus prefers moist, new surfaces, such as, glacial moraine and river banks. It can also be found on stony soils on terraces and landslides. It is commonly associated with other light-demanding species, such as, wineberry (Aristotelia serrata), mānuka (Leptospermum scoparium), and red matipō (Myrsine australis).

== Uses ==
There are several recorded Māori language names for the plant, including, hinahina, māhoe, and moeahu. The primary use of M. ramiflorus for the indigenous Māori people was using the wood to generate fire by friction. The primary use of the plant for European settlers was the burnt wood in the production of gunpowder. In traditional Māori medicinal practices, the inner bark was used to treat skin conditions and burns. The leaves were also of medicinal use. Another use for Māori was the black juice from the berries being used for tattoos (tā moko).

== Works cited ==
Books

- Crowe, Andrew (2009). Which Native Tree? New Zealand Native Trees: A Simple Guide to their Identification, Ecology and Uses. Auckland, New Zealand: Penguin Books. ISBN 978-0-14-300899-6.
- Dawson, John; Lucas, Rob (2011). Field Guide to New Zealand's Native Trees. Nelson, New Zealand: Potton & Burton. ISBN 978-1-877517-01-3.
- Gledhill, David (2008). The Names of Plants. Cambridge, United Kingdom: Cambridge University Press. ISBN 978-0-521-68553-5.
- Kirk, Thomas (1889). The Forest Flora of New Zealand. Wellington, New Zealand: Government of New Zealand.
- Wardle, J. (2011). Wardle's Native Plants of New Zealand and Their Story. Bateson Publishing Limited. ISBN 9781877520068.

Journals

- Aston, B.C. (1918). "The Poisonous and Suspected Plants of New Zealand". New Zealand Journal of Agriculture. 16 (6) – via PapersPast.
- Burrows, C. J. (1995). "Germination behaviour of seeds of the New Zealand species Fuchsia excorticata, Griselinia littoralis, Macropiper excelsum, and Melicytus ramiflorus". New Zealand Journal of Botany. 33 (1): 131–140. doi:10.1080/0028825X.1995.10412950. ISSN 0028-825X.
- Heenan, Peter B.; Courtney, Shannel P.; De Lange, Peter J.; Molloy, Brian P. J. (2018). "Three new Melicytus species from central New Zealand and a revised circumscription of Melicytus obovatus (Violaceae)". New Zealand Journal of Botany. 56 (1): 51–83. doi:10.1080/0028825X.2017.1387156. ISSN 0028-825X.
- Marshall, A.J.; Blanchon, D.J.; Aptroot, A.; De Lange, P.J. (2025). "Four new species of Aotearoa" (PDF). Ukrainian Botanical Journal. 82 (5). National Academy of Sciences of Ukraine: 435–452. doi:10.15407/ukrbotj82.05.435. ISSN 0372-4123.
- Mitchell, A. D.; Heenan, P. B.; Murray, B. G.; Molloy, B. P. J.; de Lange, P. J. (2009). "Evolution of the south-western Pacific genus Melicytus (Violaceae): evidence from DNA sequence data, cytology and sex expression". Australian Systematic Botany. 22 (3). CSIRO Publishing: 143–157. doi:10.1071/sb08042. ISSN 1030-1887.
- Powlesland, Mary H. (1984). "Reproductive biology of three species of Melicytus (Violaceae) in New Zealand". New Zealand Journal of Botany. 22 (1): 81–94. doi:10.1080/0028825X.1984.10425235. ISSN 0028-825X.
- Sopow, Stephanie L.; Bain, John (2017). "A checklist of New Zealand Cerambycidae (Insecta: Coleoptera), excluding Lamiinae". New Zealand Entomologist. 40 (2): 55–71. Bibcode:2017NZEnt..40...55S. doi:10.1080/00779962.2017.1357423. ISSN 0077-9962.
- Spencer, Kenneth A. (1976). "The agromyzidae of New Zealand (Insecta: Diptera)". Journal of the Royal Society of New Zealand. 6 (2): 153–211. doi:10.1080/03036758.1976.10421470. ISSN 0303-6758.
- Wyse, Sarah V.; Perry, George L. W.; O'Connell, Dean M.; Holland, Phillip S.; Wright, Monique J.; Hosted, Catherine L.; Whitelock, Samuel L.; Geary, Ian J.; Maurin, Kévin J. L.; Curran, Timothy J. (2016). "A Quantitative Assessment of Shoot Flammability for 60 Tree and Shrub Species Supports Rankings Based on Expert Opinion". International Journal of Wildland Fire. 25 (4): 466. doi:10.1071/WF15047. hdl:10182/6884. ISSN 1049-8001.

Websites

- De Lange, Peter (2013). "Melicytus ramiflorus subsp. ramiflorus". New Zealand Plant Conservation Network. Archived from the original on 16 September 2025.
- Hood, I.A. (2010). "Algal and Fungal Leaf Spots of Native Plants". CABI Digital Library. Forest Pathology in New Zealand.
- Vennell, Robert (2014). "Mahoe – Melicytus ramiflorus". The Meaning of Trees. Archived from the original on 10 February 2025.
- "Melicytus ramiflorus J.R.Forst. & G.Forst". Plants of the World Online. Archived from the original on 24 April 2026 – via Royal Botanic Gardens, Kew.
- "Melicytus J.R.Forst. & G.Forst". Plants of the World Online. Archived from the original on 7 February 2026 – via Royal Botanic Gardens, Kew.
- "Ngā Rauropi Whakaoranga — Melicytus ramiflorus. Māhoe. Whitey wood". Manaaki Whenua – Landcare Research. 2020. Archived from the original on 30 January 2025.
