= Charles Knight (New Zealand doctor) =

British born New Zealand doctor, public servant, botanist and mycologist

- Born: Rye, Sussex, England
- Baptised: 14 July 1808
- Died: 3 September 1891 (aged 82–83); Wellington, New Zealand
- Resting place: Bolton Street Memorial Park
- Spouse: Caroline Symes
- Relatives: Philip Levi (partner of sister-in-law)

Charles Knight (c. 1808 – 3 September 1891) was a New Zealand doctor, public servant and botanist. He was born in Rye, Sussex, England in c. 1808. He studied medicine at University College, London from 1828 until 1830. In 1840 he became a Member of the Royal College of Surgeons of Great Britain and Ireland and a Fellow in 1869. Between 1830 and 1840 Knight worked as a doctor and spent time in America.

== Administrative career ==
In 1841 he sailed to Australia as ship's surgeon on the Lord Glenelg. After arrival, he was employed by the Governor of South Australia, George Grey as a clerk. Knight moved with Grey when the latter was appointed Governor of New Zealand. In February 1846 Knight was appointed as the country's inaugural auditor-general and in 1855 became manager of the Colonial Bank of Issue and then auditor of public accounts and chaired many official commissions into subjects as diverse as flax production, meteorology and civil servant employment conditions. He later re-organised the postal banking system. In New Zealand, Knight first lived in Auckland and when the government moved to Wellington, he also relocated to the new capital in 1865.

== Botany ==
Knight was a keen botanist and his main interest was lichens. He was the author of 20 scientific papers, 16 about lichens. Knight exchanged letters with Joseph Hooker Director of the Royal Botanic Garden at Kew for over 30 years. He also contributed specimens and drawings to the collections there and in other countries as well as in New Zealand. In addition, he organised New Zealand government funding for Hooker to write the Handbook of the New Zealand flora published in 1864. During 1868 and 1869 Knight was in Britain with Grey, and was able to spend time with the botanists and lichen collections at Kew. He was elected a fellow of the Linnean Society of London in 1857. He joined the Wellington Philosophical Society in 1869 and was president in 1873 and 1874. He was a member of the board of governors of the New Zealand Institute from 1870 to 1872 and in 1875.

== Personal life ==
Knight married Caroline Symes in 1844 when he was living in Adelaide. They had two sons and three daughters together. He died at his home in Wellington and is buried at Bolton Street Memorial Park.

== Legacy ==
Knight's extensive personal collection of specimens is in Museum of New Zealand Te Papa Tongarewa although he also contributed to around 20 other herbaria in other countries.
