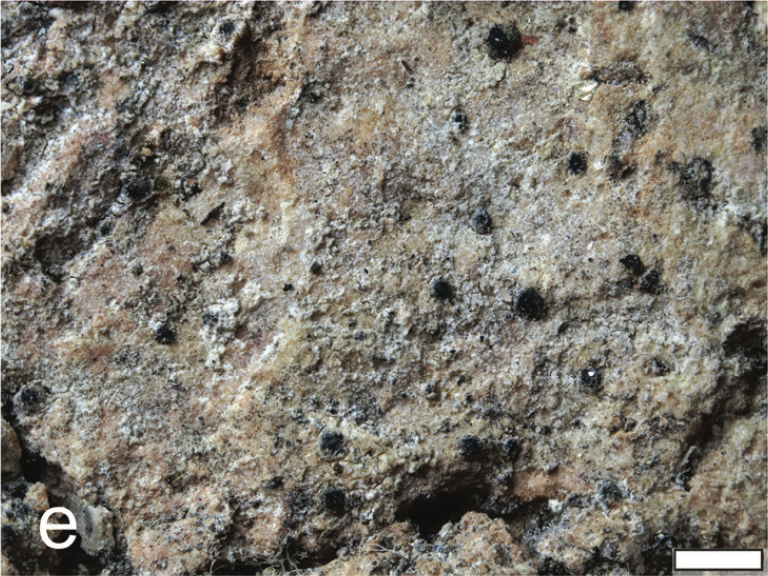
- Image of the holotype specimen; scale bar = 0.5 mm

Scientific classification
- Kingdom: Fungi
- Division: Ascomycota
- Class: Eurotiomycetes
- Order: Verrucariales
- Family: Verrucariaceae
- Genus: Verrucaria
- Species: V. kuusamoensis

Binomial name
- Verrucaria kuusamoensis Pykälä, Kantelinen & Myllys (2020)
- Holotype: Oulanka National Park, Finland

= Verrucaria kuusamoensis =

Species of lichen

Verrucaria kuusamoensis is a species of saxicolous (rock-dwelling) crustose lichen in the family Verrucariaceae. It is found within a small region of northeastern Finland.

== Taxonomy ==
Verrucaria kuusamoensis was described as new to science in 2020 by the Finnish lichenologists Juha Pykälä, Annina Kantelinen and Leena Myllys. It belongs to the genus Verrucaria, a group of lichens characterised by their small, flask-shaped fruiting bodies (perithecia) and crustose growth form. While morphologically similar to some other Verrucaria species, particularly V. subdevergens, it is genetically distinct. DNA analysis of the internal transcribed spacer region shows a sequence divergence of 6.8–7.4% from its closest relatives, supporting its status as a separate species.

== Description ==
The thallus (lichen body) of Verrucaria kuusamoensis is typically white, grey, or occasionally pale brown. It is usually thinly epilithic (growing on the rock surface) but can sometimes be endolithic (growing within the rock). The thallus is often continuous or cracked and can have a powdery appearance. A feature of V. kuusamoensis is that adjacent thalli are occasionally separated by a dark line, though this is not always present.

The perithecia are relatively large for the genus (0.17–0.45 mm in diameter) and are partially to fully immersed in the rock substrate, typically leaving shallow to deep pits. A key diagnostic feature is the involucrellum, an outer layer covering the perithecium, which usually extends to cover more than half of the perithecium's height.

The spores of V. kuusamoensis are large, measuring 21–34 μm long and 9–14 μm wide. They are non-septate (lacking internal divisions) and enclosed in a thin perispore.

== Habitat and distribution ==
Verrucaria kuusamoensis is named after the Kuusamo area in northeastern Finland, where it is relatively common on dolomite rocks. It has been found in various habitats within this region, including rock outcrops, boulders, and cliff faces.

The species appears to be endemic to the Oulanka area in the municipalities of Kuusamo and Salla, in the biogeographical province of Koillismaa. It has not been found in southern Finland, suggesting a preference for northern boreal conditions.

Verrucaria kuusamoensis seems to be rather common within its limited range, which contrasts with the rarity of many other recently described Verrucaria species in Finland. This relative abundance in a specific area highlights the importance of local geological features, such as the dolomite formations in Oulanka, in supporting unique lichen diversity.

== See also ==
- List of Verrucaria species
