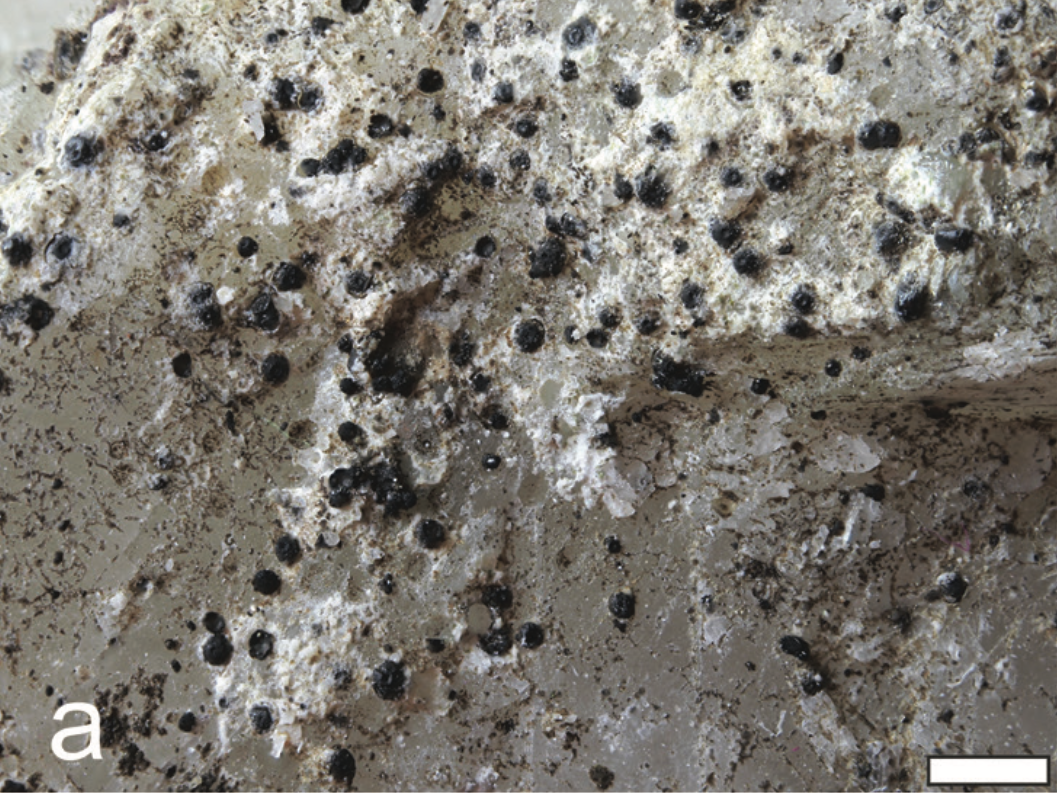
- Image of holotype specimen; scale bar = 1 mm

Scientific classification
- Kingdom: Fungi
- Division: Ascomycota
- Class: Eurotiomycetes
- Order: Verrucariales
- Family: Verrucariaceae
- Genus: Verrucaria
- Species: V. bifurcata

Binomial name
- Verrucaria bifurcata Pykälä, Kantelinen & Myllys (2020)
- Holotype: Varsinais-Suomi, Finland

= Verrucaria bifurcata =

Species of lichen

Verrucaria bifurcata is a species of saxicolous (rock-dwelling) crustose lichen in the family Verrucariaceae. It is found in southern Finland.

== Taxonomy ==
Verrucaria bifurcata was described as new to science in 2020 by the Finnish lichenologists Juha Pykälä, Annina Kantelinen and Leena Myllys. It belongs to a group of Verrucaria species characterised by large spores, perithecia (fruiting bodies) that leave pits in the rock substrate, and a pale, thin thallus (lichen body). It is part of the "Verrucaria subtilis complex" along with the closely related species V. cavernarum, V. difficilis and V. subtilis. While morphologically similar to these species, V. bifurcata can be distinguished genetically through DNA analysis of the internal transcribed spacer region.

== Description ==
Verrucaria bifurcata forms a thin, pale grey or whitish crust (thallus) on calcareous rock surfaces. This thallus is often barely visible, growing mostly within the rock (endolithic) rather than on the surface.

The reproductive structures (perithecia) are small (0.13–0.26 mm in diameter) and mostly sunken into the rock, leaving shallow to deep pits. A key diagnostic feature of V. bifurcata is its highly variable involucrellum – an outer layer covering the perithecium. This can range from being absent to covering the entire structure.

The spores produced by V. bifurcata are relatively large for the genus, measuring 21–30 μm long and 9–13 μm wide. They lack internal divisions (non-septate).

== Habitat and distribution ==
Verrucaria bifurcata grows on calcareous rocks, showing a preference for loose pebbles and stones in disused limestone quarries. It can tolerate both exposed sunny locations and more shaded sites.

The species is currently known only from southern Finland, with records from the southwest (Varsinais-Suomi region) and southeast (Etelä-Savo region) of the country. Its apparent restriction to southern areas of Finland distinguishes it ecologically from many related Verrucaria species that have more northerly distributions in the country.

== See also ==
- List of Verrucaria species
