= Verrucaria oulankaensis =

Scientific classification
- Kingdom: Fungi
- Division: Ascomycota
- Class: Eurotiomycetes
- Order: Verrucariales
- Family: Verrucariaceae
- Genus: Verrucaria
- Species: V. oulankaensis

Binomial name
- Verrucaria oulankaensis Pykälä & Myllys (2017)

Species of lichen-forming fungus

Verrucaria oulankaensis is a rare species of saxicolous (rock-dwelling) crustose lichen in the family Verrucariaceae. It is found in north-eastern Finland, where it occurs on calcareous rocks on river shores.

== Taxonomy ==
The lichen was formally described as a new species in 2017 by Juha Pykälä and Leena Myllys. The type specimen was collected by the first author along the shore of the Oulankajoki river in Oulanka National Park (Koillismaa); there, at an altitude of 180 m (590 ft), it was found growing on a dolomite rock outcrop jutting out from a southwest-facing rock wall. The species epithet oulankaensis refers to the predominance of collections from the Oulanka area, which the authors call "one of the lichenologically most important areas in Finland". The type specimen is kept in the collections of the mycological herbaria of the Botanical Museum of the Finnish Museum of Natural History.

== Description ==
The colour of the crust-like thallus Verrucaria oulankaensis ranges from pale brown to brownish grey, medium brown or dark brown, and usually grey with a pruinose covering. It has a dark brown prothallus. The perithecia are immersed in the thallus, and measure 0.12–0.27 mm in diameter, and have a dark ostiole (pore) that is often inconspicuous. The exciple (the ring-shaped tissue layer surrounding the hymenium) measures 0.15–0.25 mm and has a dark brown wall. Algal cells are 5–10 μm wide. The asci contain eight spores and measure about 50–61 by 19–24 μm. Ascospores are 16.2–19.3 by 7.7–9.1 μm and lack a perispore (a colourless, often gelatinous enveloping layer).

== Habitat and distribution ==
Verrucaria oulankaensis grows on calcareous rocks, and all collections have been made from river shores – a particular habitat that is rare in Finland. The lichen is known to occur only in Oulanka area of northeastern Finland. A common lichen associate in its habitat is Staurothele areolata. Other rare lichens occurring in this area are Nephroma helveticum and Peltigera retifoveata.

== See also ==
- List of Verrucaria species
