= Verrucaria rosula =

Scientific classification
- Domain: Eukaryota
- Kingdom: Fungi
- Division: Ascomycota
- Class: Eurotiomycetes
- Order: Verrucariales
- Family: Verrucariaceae
- Genus: Verrucaria
- Species: V. rosula

Binomial name
- Verrucaria rosula Orange (2013)

Species of lichen

Verrucaria rosula is a species of saxicolous (rock-dwelling), crustose lichen in the family Verrucariaceae. It is known from several European countries, including Britain and France. The lichen is characterised by its distinctive growth pattern, forming rosette-like patches that merge together as they develop—a feature that inspired its name rosula (meaning "little rose"). Its thallus varies from grey-green to brown, depending on light exposure, and features rounded reproductive structures with pale openings. V. rosula typically occurs on damp rocks and stones near streams or on water-saturated ground, where it grows alongside several other wetland lichen species.

== Taxonomy ==
Verrucaria rosula was formally described as a new species in 2013 by the British lichenologist Alan Orange. The type specimen was collected by Orange from Cwm Dringarth, Brecon Beacons (Brecknockshire), where it was found growing on an unshaded rock in a flush. New thallus growth in the lichen is initiated by tiny, roughly spherical or polyhedral granules that increase in size to eventually form somewhat circular, rosette-like patches; the species epithet rosula refers to this type of growth.

== Description ==
The thallus (the main body of the lichen) of Verrucaria rosula grows superficially on its substrate, varying in colour from grey-green (in shaded areas) to brown, and measuring 40–200 micrometres (μm) in thickness. The lichen begins its development as very small granules, first visible as tiny round structures about 20–60 μm wide. These granules expand to form flattened, circular, rosette-like patches with minutely scalloped margins—a characteristic that inspired the species name rosula (meaning "little rose"). As the lichen matures, these patches merge with neighbouring ones, creating a spreading crust with few or occasional secondary cracks. Healthy new layers of thallus often grow over older, partially dead or heavily pigmented layers.

The thallus surface appears minutely uneven at a scale of about 20–50 micrometers. When examined in cross-section, the thallus is typically divided into small units approximately 30–80 μm wide. It has a paraplectenchymatous structure (composed of cells arranged in a tissue-like pattern), with fungal cells that are more or less round, measuring 4–10 by 3–6 μm. Cell walls are thin or slightly thickened (about 0.5–0.8 micrometers thick), with brown pigmentation in exposed surface cells. The photobiont (the algal partner in the lichen symbiosis) consists of cells measuring 4–10 by 3.5–7.5 μm.

The reproductive structures (perithecia) form projections 240–400 μm in diameter, often with irregular thallus coverage on their lower portions but exposed above. The ostiolar region (the opening through which spores are released) is frequently conspicuous, appearing as a pale brown or whitish dot 40–80 μm wide, either flat or slightly convex. The exciple (inner protective wall) measures 180–305 μm in diameter and is unpigmented except for dilute brown colouration near the ostiole. The involucrellum (outer protective covering) varies in development, often closely following the exciple or forming a more conical shape extending to the substrate.

The asci (spore-producing cells) each contain eight spores. The ascospores (fungal spores) are colourless, oblong-ellipsoid, non-septate, and usually widest above the middle. They typically measure 22.5–24.8–27.0 by 9.0–10.0–11.0 μm, being 2.3–2.5 times as long as wide. Pycnidia (asexual reproductive structures) are rare or easily overlooked, with conidia (asexual spores) measuring approximately 5.0 by 1.2 μm.

== Habitat and distribution ==
Verrucaria rosula is found in Wales, southwest England, Scotland, and France, where it occurs on damp siliceous rocks and stones near streams or on flushed ground. Lichens that associate with V. rosula include Ionaspis lacustris, Thelidium pluvium, Verrucaria cernaensis, V. hydrophila, V. sublobulata and V. margacea.

== See also ==
- List of Verrucaria species
