= Verrucaria ahtii =

Scientific classification
- Kingdom: Fungi
- Division: Ascomycota
- Class: Eurotiomycetes
- Order: Verrucariales
- Family: Verrucariaceae
- Genus: Verrucaria
- Species: V. ahtii

Binomial name
- Verrucaria ahtii Pykälä, Launis & Myllys (2017)

Species of lichen

Verrucaria ahtii is a species of saxicolous (rock-dwelling) crustose lichen in the family Verrucariaceae. It is found in Finland, Lithuania, Russia, and Switzerland, where it occurs on calcareous pebbles.

== Taxonomy ==
The lichen was formally described as a new species in 2017 by Juha Pykälä, Annina Launis, and Leena Myllys. The type specimen was collected by the first author in Lohja (Southwest Finland) on a high road bank northwest of a lime processing factory; there it was found growing on a pebbles that may have been enriched by calcium-rich dust. The species epithet honours Finnish lichenologist Teuvo Ahti, "for his major contributions to lichenology". The type specimen is kept in the collections of the mycological herbaria of the Botanical Museum of the Finnish Museum of Natural History.

Molecular phylogenetic analysis of DNA sequences from the internal transcribed spacer regions shows that Verrucaria ahtii is closely related to V. vitikainenii.

== Description ==
The crust-like thallus Verrucaria ahtii is usually from medium brown to dark grey (rarely, it is grey), and has a flake-like consistency. It has a medium- to dark-brown prothallus that is often inconspicuous. The perithecia are partly immersed in the thallus, measure 0.15–0.32 mm in diameter, and have a dark, flat, inconspicuous ostiole (pore). The exciple (the ring-shaped tissue layer surrounding the hymenium) measures 0.16–0.32 mm and has a dark brown wall about 13–18 μm thick. Algal cells are 5–11 μm wide. Ascospores are 20.6–25.5 by 10.2–12.4 μm and lack a perispore (a colorless, often gelatinous enveloping layer).

== Habitat and distribution ==
Verrucaria ahtii grows on calcareous pebbles, and on siliceous pebbles that have been enriched with calcareous dust. It prefers sunny habitats, and has been recorded from south-facing rock walls in lime quarries. The lichen was originally known to occur in Finland, Lithuania, and Russia. In 2018, it was recorded from Switzerland, where it was found growing on calcareous plaster on a humid and shaded wall. The Lithuanian and Russian collections were incorrectly reported as Verrucaria invenusta.

== See also ==
- List of Verrucaria species
