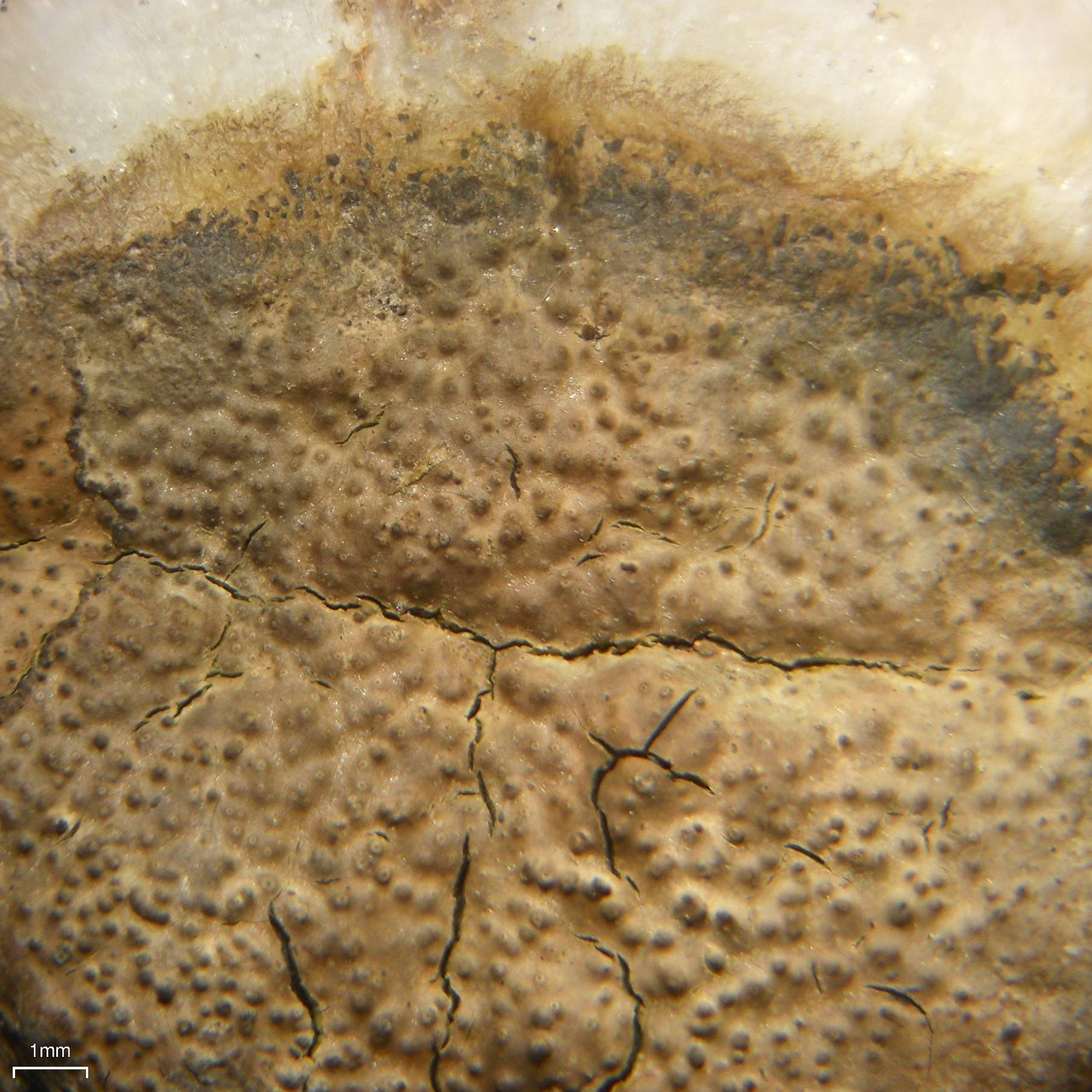
- on submerged quartzite; scale bar = 1 mm

Scientific classification
- Domain: Eukaryota
- Kingdom: Fungi
- Division: Ascomycota
- Class: Eurotiomycetes
- Order: Verrucariales
- Family: Verrucariaceae
- Genus: Verrucaria
- Species: V. funckii

Binomial name
- Verrucaria funckii (Spreng.) Zahlbr. (1921)

Synonyms
- List: Lithoicea funckii (Spreng.) A.Massal. (1853); Pyrenula funckii Spreng. (1826); Verrucaria collematodes f. funckii (Spreng.) Servít (1946); Verrucaria degenerascens Nyl. ex A.L.Sm. (1911); Verrucaria elaeomelaena f. silicicola Zschacke (1927); Verrucaria nigrescens var. funckii (Spreng.) Zwackh (1883); Verrucaria silicea Servít (1954); Verrucaria silicicola (Zschacke) Servít (1950)

= Verrucaria funckii =

Species of lichen

Verrucaria funckii is a species of crustose lichen in the family Verrucariaceae. It grows on rocks in aquatic environments. First described as a new species in 1826 and named after the German botanist Heinrich Christian Funck, it features a light grey-green to grey-brown, somewhat gelatinous thallus. Its reproductive structures are typically embedded within the body rather than projecting from it. The species is widespread throughout Europe, particularly in northern and western regions, as well as parts of Asia and North America, where it inhabits permanently or largely submerged siliceous rocks in streams, rivers, and lake shores. Unlike most lichens, it contains yellow-green algae rather than green algae as its photosynthetic partner (photobiont).

== Taxonomy ==
The lichen was first formally described in 1826 by Kurt Polycarp Joachim Sprengel, as a species of Pyrenula. The species epithet honours German botanist Heinrich Christian Funck, who published the taxon in his series Kryptogamische Gewächse des Fichtelgebirges ("Cryptogamous plants of the Fichtel Mountains"). Alexander Zahlbruckner transferred the taxon to the genus Verrucaria in 1922.

== Description ==
Verrucaria funckii has a light grey-green to grey-brown, somewhat gelatinous thallus that typically measures between 80–160 μm thick, though it can range from 20–240 μm. The surface of the thallus is generally smooth and uncracked, though rare specimens may display a few cracks. The cells within the thallus are arranged in distinctive vertical columns. At the edge of some specimens, a whitish prothallus (initial growth layer) may be visible, though it lacks a fringed (fimbriate) appearance and is sometimes absent entirely. In specimens where erosion has occurred, the exposed black basal layer along the thallus margins might be mistaken for a black prothallus.

The reproductive structures (perithecia) of V. funckii are typically embedded within the thallus rather than prominently projecting from it. They form shallow, conical projections measuring 300–600 μm in diameter, though rarely these may be conical-hemispherical in shape. These structures are usually completely covered by the thallus material, with only the apex visible at the surface as a small grey dot, or occasionally exposed through abrasion as a small black disc. When examined in cross-section, the perithecia measure 180–390 μm in diameter and are colourless at the sides and base, often displaying a dilute brown colouration at the opening (ostiole).

The protective outer covering of the perithecium (involucrellum) is well-developed, extending to the base of the thallus with distinctly conical shape. The sides of this structure are either straight or slightly concave, though sometimes they may be convex. At its base, the involucrellum often spreads widely and merges with the basal layer of the thallus when present. The pigment in the involucrellum is red-brown and turns grey when treated with potassium hydroxide solution (K+). In many specimens, the thallus completely covers the involucrellum, resulting in an algae-free region around the ostiole that extends to the thallus surface.

The spore-containing sacs (asci) within the perithecia produce ellipsoidal to narrowly ellipsoidal spores (ascospores) measuring about 22.5–25.5 by 9–11 μm, though they can range from 19.5–28.5 by 8–13 μm. These spores are typically 2.1–2.6 times as long as they are wide and possess a thin outer layer (perispore) measuring about 0.5 μm thick, occasionally up to 2 μm, which is visible on at least some spores.

Verrucaria funckii is an example of a xantholichen; that is, a lichen in which the photobiont partner is yellow-green algae (class Xanthophyceae), in this case, Heterococcus caespitosus.

== Similar species ==
Verrucaria funckii occurs on submerged or inundated rocks and pebbles, typically siliceous rocks, in streams, river systems, and lake shores. It is widespread in Europe, including Northern Europe and Iceland, central regions such as the Carpathian Mountains and the Alps, and southern Europe. It is also found in Asia and North America. In the British Isles, it is particularly common in northern and western regions, often inhabiting granite and slate stream beds.

== Habitat and distribution ==
Verrucaria funckii occurs on inundated or submerged rocks (typically siliceous rocks) and pebbles in streams and lake shores. It is widespread in Europe, including Northern Europe and Iceland, central Europe including the Carpathian Mountains and the Alps, and southern Europe. It is also found in Asia and North America. In the British Isles, it is particularly common in northern and western regions on permanently or largely submerged siliceous rocks. Typical habitats include granite and slate stream beds, river systems, and lake shores.

== See also ==
- List of Verrucaria species
