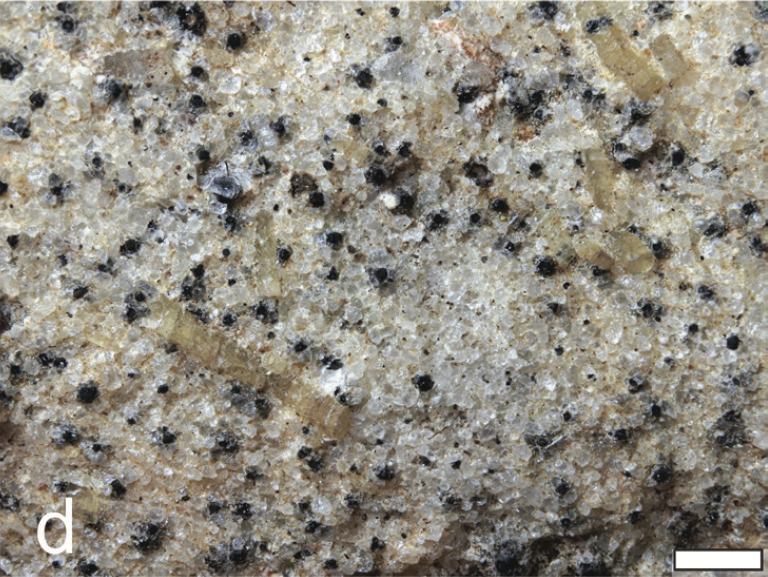
- Image of holotype specimen; scale bar = 1 mm

Scientific classification
- Kingdom: Fungi
- Division: Ascomycota
- Class: Eurotiomycetes
- Order: Verrucariales
- Family: Verrucariaceae
- Genus: Verrucaria
- Species: V. fuscozonata

Binomial name
- Verrucaria fuscozonata Pykälä, Kantelinen & Myllys (2020)
- Holotype: Oulanka National Park, Finland

= Verrucaria fuscozonata =

Species of lichen

Verrucaria fuscozonata is a rare species of saxicolous (rock-dwelling) crustose lichen in the family Verrucariaceae. It is only known to occur in a single location in northeastern Finland.

== Taxonomy ==
Verrucaria fuscozonata was described as new to science in 2020 by the Finnish lichenologists Juha Pykälä, Annina Kantelinen and Leena Myllys. It belongs to the genus Verrucaria, a group of lichens characterised by their small, flask-shaped fruiting bodies (perithecia) and crustose growth form. While it shares some morphological similarities with other Verrucaria species, particularly those in the V. subtilis complex, V. fuscozonata is genetically distinct. Its unique genetic profile, based on internal transcribed spacer sequence analysis, sets it apart from other known Verrucaria species.

== Description ==
The thallus (lichen body) of Verrucaria fuscozonata is pale grey and primarily endolithic, meaning it grows within the rock substrate rather than on its surface. A distinctive feature of this species is the presence of dark lines between adjacent thalli, which gives rise to its species epithet fuscozonata, referring to these dark zonal markings.

The perithecia are small (0.11–0.26 mm in diameter) and mostly immersed in the rock, leaving shallow to deep pits. They are relatively numerous, with 120–140 perithecia per square centimetre. A key diagnostic feature of V. fuscozonata is its involucrellum, an outer layer covering the perithecium. In this species, the involucrellum extends to the base of the perithecium and is tightly appressed to it, measuring 50–60 μm in thickness.

The spores of V. fuscozonata are moderately large for the genus, measuring 21–29 μm long and 10–13 μm wide. They are non-septate (lacking internal divisions) and enclosed in a thin perispore.

== Habitat and distribution ==
Verrucaria fuscozonata is known only from a single location in northeastern Finland, specifically in the Oulanka area of the Koillismaa region. The only known specimen was found growing on dolomite rock on a river shore.

This highly restricted distribution makes V. fuscozonata one of the rarest known Verrucaria species in Finland. Its apparent preference for dolomite substrate in a riparian environment suggests it may have specific ecological requirements, though more research is needed to confirm this. The species' rarity and limited known distribution make it a subject of interest for further lichenological surveys in Finland and potentially in neighbouring regions with similar geological features.

== See also ==
- List of Verrucaria species
