= Verrucaria yoshimurae =

Scientific classification
- Kingdom: Fungi
- Division: Ascomycota
- Class: Eurotiomycetes
- Order: Verrucariales
- Family: Verrucariaceae
- Genus: Verrucaria
- Species: V. yoshimurae

Binomial name
- Verrucaria yoshimurae H.Harada (2011)

Species of lichen

Verrucaria yoshimurae is a species of saxicolous (rock-dwelling), crustose lichen in the family Verrucariaceae. Found in Japan, it was formally described as a new species in 2011 by lichenologist Hiroshi Harada. This freshwater lichen has a relatively pale thallus. The species epithet honours Japanese botanist and lichenologist Isao Yoshimura.

== See also ==
- List of Verrucaria species
