= Verrucaria takagoensis =

Scientific classification
- Kingdom: Fungi
- Division: Ascomycota
- Class: Eurotiomycetes
- Order: Verrucariales
- Family: Verrucariaceae
- Genus: Verrucaria
- Species: V. takagoensis

Binomial name
- Verrucaria takagoensis H.Harada (2001)

Species of lichen

Verrucaria takagoensis is a species of saxicolous (rock-dwelling), crustose lichen in the family Verrucariaceae. Found in semi-freshwater habitats in Chiba Prefecture, central Japan, it was formally described as a new species in 2001 by lichenologist Hiroshi Harada. The lichen has almost spherical, exposed black perithecia measuring 0.1–0.2 mm in diameter, with brownish-black perithecial walls, and lacking a distinct involucrellum. The periphyses are 5–10 μm long with pointed apices, while its ascospores measure 6–8 by 4–5 μm. Verrucaria takagoensis has a translucent or almost transparent (semipellucid) brownish, thin thallus.

== See also ==
- List of Verrucaria species
