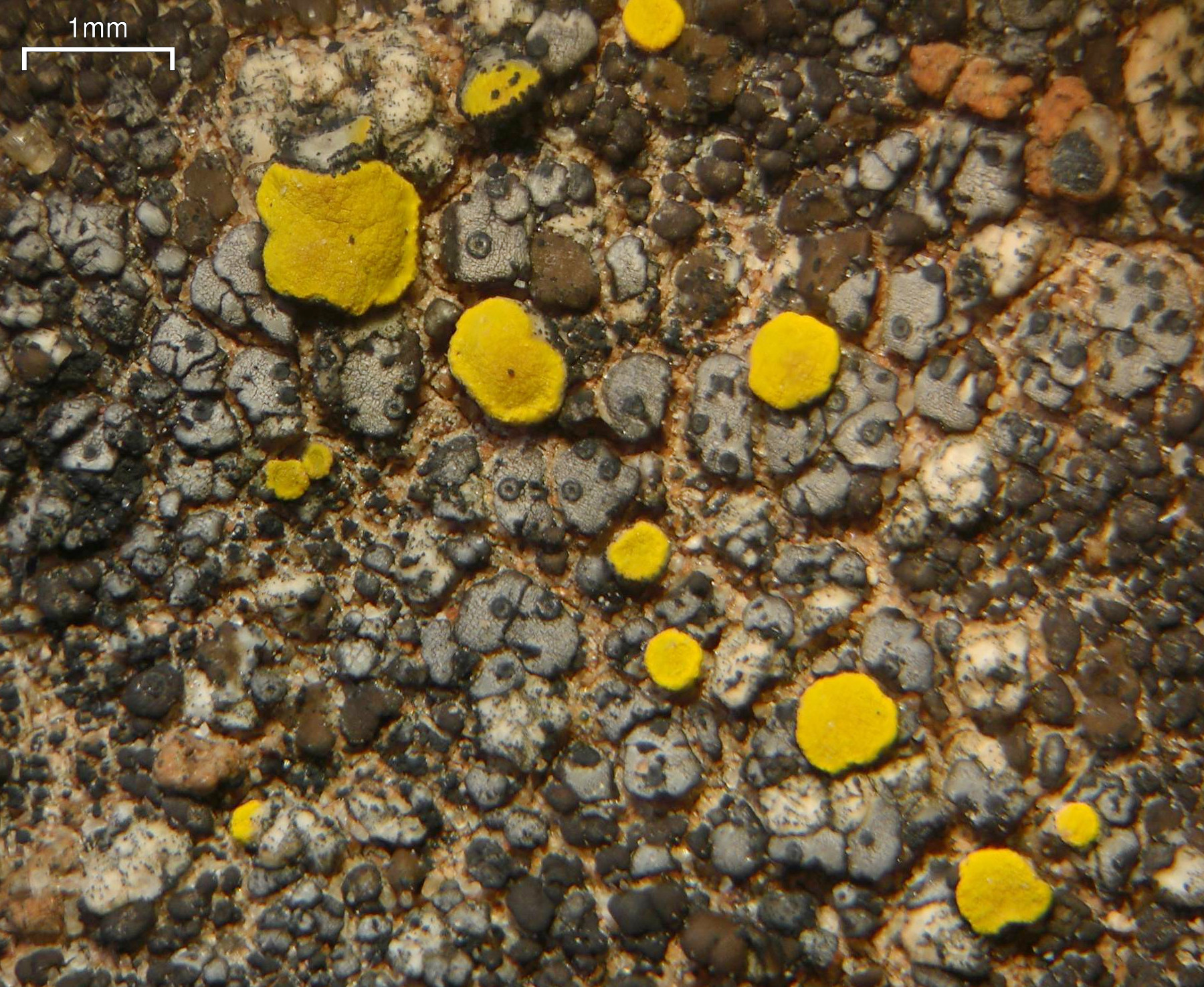
- Verrucaria bernaicensis on the exposed face of a sandstone boulder in Utah

Scientific classification
- Domain: Eukaryota
- Kingdom: Fungi
- Division: Ascomycota
- Class: Eurotiomycetes
- Order: Verrucariales
- Family: Verrucariaceae
- Genus: Verrucaria
- Species: V. bernaicensis

Binomial name
- Verrucaria bernaicensis Malbr. (1869)

Synonyms
- Involucrocarpon bernaicense (Malbr.) Servít (1956)

= Verrucaria bernaicensis =

Species of lichen

Verrucaria bernaicensis is a species of saxicolous (rock-dwelling), crustose lichen in the family Verrucariaceae. It was first formally described by Alexandre François Malbranche in 1869. It has a dull, pale grey thallus that is areolate to somewhat squamulose in form. Its perithecia are immersed in the substrata, measure 0.2–0.3 mm in diameter, and lack an involucrellum. Its ascospores are broadly ellipsoid to roughly spherical, measuring 9–11 by 7–9 μm. The lichen has been recorded from Asia, a few European countries, Russia and the Caucasus, and southwestern North America.

== See also ==
- List of Verrucaria species
