= Verrucaria kowenensis =

Scientific classification
- Kingdom: Fungi
- Division: Ascomycota
- Class: Eurotiomycetes
- Order: Verrucariales
- Family: Verrucariaceae
- Genus: Verrucaria
- Species: V. kowenensis

Binomial name
- Verrucaria kowenensis P.M.McCarthy (2020)

Species of lichen

Verrucaria kowenensis is a species of terricolous (ground-dwelling), crustose lichen in the family Verrucariaceae. It is found in the Australian Capital Territory of Australia, where it grows on silica-rich soil.

== Taxonomy ==
The lichen was formally described as a new species in 2020 by lichenologist Patrick M. McCarthy. The type specimen was collected by the author from Kowen Forest (Australian Capital Territory) at an altitude of 700 m (2,300 ft); there, on an old road bank bordering dry Eucalyptus woodland, it was found growing on siliceous soil. The species name refers to the type locality. Other lichens occurring in this species-poor habitat include Trapelia concentrica and unidentified species of Sarcogyne and Arthonia.

== Description ==
Verrucaria kowenensis has an inconspicuous thallus with a pale grey-green or light to medium greenish-grey hue. Its thallus, which is areolate to pseudosquamulose, is comparatively thick, corticate, and primarily algal. The perithecia (fruiting bodies), though numerous, are extremely small and do not have an involucrellum. They are largely submerged within the thallus, displaying a black apex, with the excipulum remaining colourless at the sides and base. Its ascospores, which have a biseriate arrangement in the ascus, measure between 11 and 20 μm in length and 5–7.5 μm in width.

Verrucaria kowenensis shares a wide range of similarities with the land-dwelling Australian endemic species, V. solicola. However, it distinguishes itself by possessing a thallus that is thicker, areolate, or finely pseudosquamulose with a dual-layered cortex. Further, it has considerably smaller perithecia with a thinner and lighter exciple on the sides and at the base, and its asci are also shorter.

== See also ==
- List of Verrucaria species
