= Verrucaria vitikainenii =

Scientific classification
- Kingdom: Fungi
- Division: Ascomycota
- Class: Eurotiomycetes
- Order: Verrucariales
- Family: Verrucariaceae
- Genus: Verrucaria
- Species: V. vitikainenii

Binomial name
- Verrucaria vitikainenii Pykälä, Launis & Myllys (2017)

Species of lichen

Verrucaria vitikainenii is a species of saxicolous (rock-dwelling) crustose lichen in the family Verrucariaceae. It is found in Finland, where it occurs on calcareous rock outcrops.

== Taxonomy ==
The lichen was formally described as a new species in 2017 by Juha Pykälä, Annina Launis, and Leena Myllys. The type specimen was collected by the first author from a dolomite rock outcrop in Kurtinniittykuru (Hautajärvi, Koillismaa); there, at an altitude of 205 m (673 ft), it was found growing on pebbles on a steep slope beneath a west-facing rock wall. The species epithet honours Finnish lichenologist Orvo Vitikainen, who has, according to the authors, "contributed significantly to the knowledge of taxonomy and biogeography of Finnish lichens". The type specimen is kept in the collections of the mycological herbaria of the Botanical Museum of the Finnish Museum of Natural History.

== Description ==
The crust-like thallus of Verrucaria vitikainenii is typically medium to dark brown, with a "fleck-like" consistency that is sometimes poorly developed. It does not have a prothallus. The perithecia are partially immersed in the thallus, and measure 0.2–0.36 mm in diameter, and have an ostiole (pore) that is often inconspicuous. The exciple (the ring-shaped tissue layer surrounding the hymenium) is dark brown to black with a diameter of 0.19–0.27 mm. The asci contain eight spores and measure about 65–82 by 25–30 μm. Ascospores are 21.9–25.6 by 10.9–12.8 μm and lack a perispore (a colorless, often gelatinous enveloping layer).

== Habitat and distribution ==
Verrucaria vitikainenii occurs on calcareous rock outcrops, and may prefer partly shaded habitats. Apart from its main distribution in the Oulanka area of northeastern Finland, it is rare in the country, having been recorded once from eastern Finland and one from south-west Finland.

== See also ==
- List of Verrucaria species
