= List of Verrucaria species =

Verrucaria is a large genus of lichens in the family Verrucariaceae. As of October 2025, Species Fungorum (in the Catalog of Life) includes 405 species in the genus. Historically, many more taxa than this have been placed in genus Verrucaria at some time in their taxonomic history. For example, the nomenclatural authority Index Fungorum has 4127 taxa with the genus name Verrucaria, including species, varieties, and forms.

== A ==
- Verrucaria abdita Servít (1952)
- Verrucaria aberrans Garov. (1865)
- Verrucaria acrotella Ach. (1803)
- Verrucaria adelminienii Zschacke (1933)
- Verrucaria adguttata Zahlbr. (1941)
- Verrucaria aemula Servít (1950)
- Verrucaria aethiobola Wahlenb. ex Ach. (1803)
- Verrucaria aethioboliza Nyl. (1875)
- Verrucaria aethiobolizans Zahlbr. (1930)
- Verrucaria aethioboloides Zschacke (1933)
- Verrucaria ahlesiana (Zwackh) Nik.Hoffm. & Hafellner (2000)
- Verrucaria ahtii Pykälä, Launis & Myllys (2017) – Finland, Lithuania, Russia, Switzerland
- Verrucaria albofusca Servít (1948)
- Verrucaria albomarginata Hoffm. (1787)
- Verrucaria alborimosa P.M.McCarthy & Kantvilas (2015) – Australia
- Verrucaria aljazevi Servít (1948)
- Verrucaria allantoidea H.Harada (1995) – Japan
- Verrucaria alpicola Zschacke (1931)
- Verrucaria alpigena Breuss (2008)
- Verrucaria ambigua Erichsen (1939)
- Verrucaria ambronica Erichsen (1941)
- Verrucaria amnica P.M.McCarthy & P.N.Johnson (1997)
- Verrucaria ampezzana Servít (1950)
- Verrucaria amylophora Lettau (1940)
- Verrucaria anceps Arnold (1858)
- Verrucaria andalusiensis Werner (1937)
- Verrucaria andesiatica Servít (1950)
- Verrucaria anemoides Servít (1949)
- Verrucaria anisomera Nyl. (1873)
- Verrucaria antepotens Orange (2022) – Nepal
- Verrucaria antillarum B.de Lesd. (1943)
- Verrucaria antiquitatis Flörke (1807)
- Verrucaria antricola Wedd. (1875)
- Verrucaria anulata Humb. (1793)
- Verrucaria anziana Garov. (1865)
- Verrucaria anzianoides H.Magn. (1952)
- Verrucaria applanata Hepp ex Arnold (1868)
- Verrucaria applanatula H.Magn. (1940)
- Verrucaria aptrootii M.S.Iqbal & Khalid (2024)
- Verrucaria aquatilis Mudd (1861)
- Verrucaria aranensis P.M.McCarthy (1988)
- Verrucaria arboricola Zahlbr. (1930)
- Verrucaria arctica Lynge (1928)
- Verrucaria arduennica Zschacke (1933)
- Verrucaria arenzanoensis Servít (1950)
- Verrucaria areolata Wallr. (1831)
- Verrucaria areolatodiffracta Zschacke (1927)
- Verrucaria argenteofusca Hoffm. (1796)
- Verrucaria argillacea Fr. (1831)
- Verrucaria arisana Zahlbr. (1933)
- Verrucaria arthrospora Garov. (1865)
- Verrucaria aspecta Breuss (2007)
- Verrucaria asperula Servít (1949)
- Verrucaria aspicilioides Vain. (1921)
- Verrucaria astata C.Knight (1876)
- Verrucaria astroidea Nyl. (1863)
- Verrucaria atacta Bél. (1834)
- Verrucaria atrata Hoffm. (1796)
- Verrucaria atricolor H.Magn. (1944)
- Verrucaria atroviridula Zschacke (1933)
- Verrucaria aucklandica Zahlbr. (1941)
- Verrucaria aureocerina Hoffm. (1796)
- Verrucaria australiensis P.M.McCarthy (1991) – Australia
- Verrucaria austroalpina P.M.McCarthy (1995) – Australia
- Verrucaria austroschisticola P.M.McCarthy & P.N.Johnson (1995)

== B ==
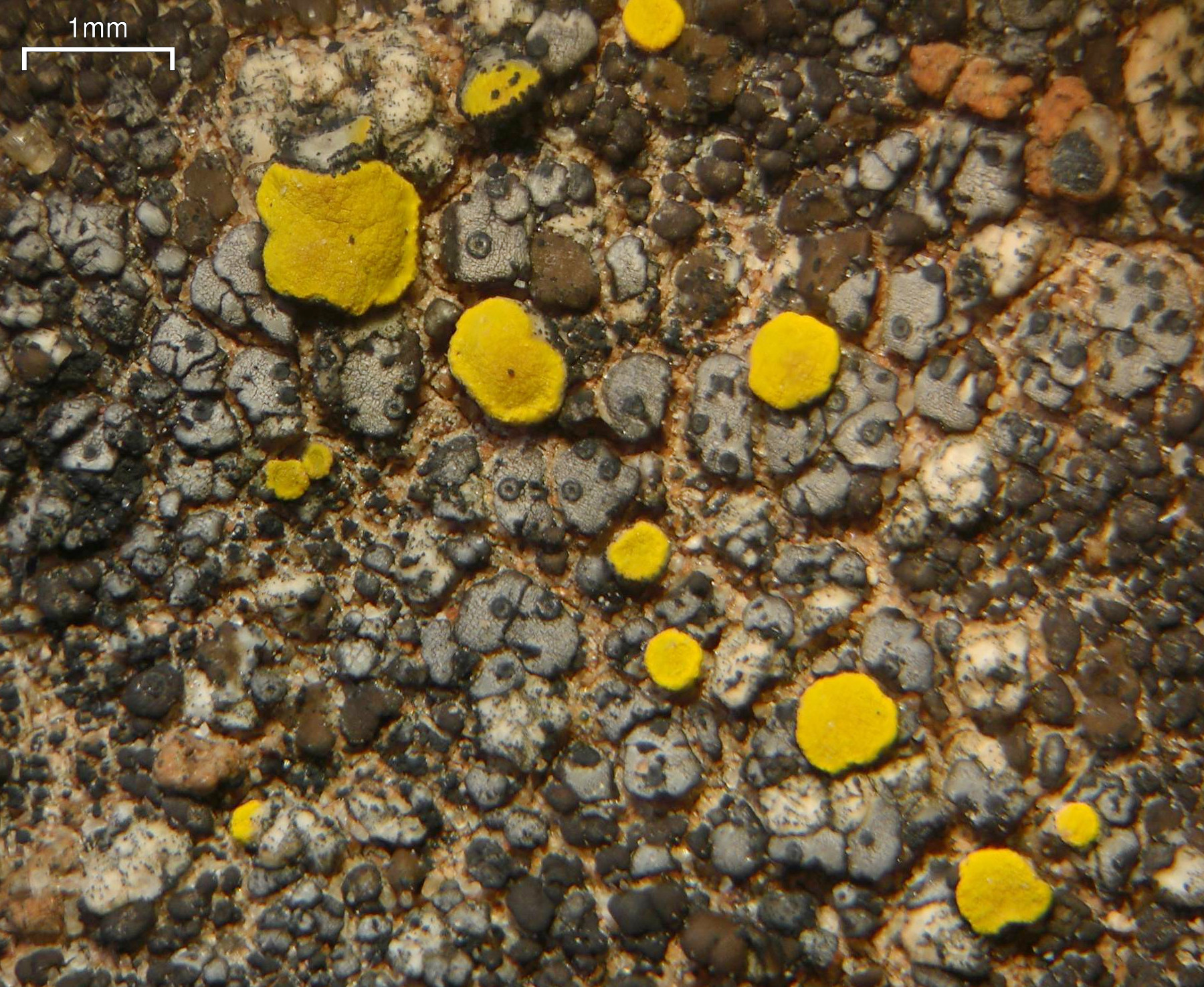
Verrucaria bernaicensis

- Verrucaria bachmanniana Zschacke (1931)
- Verrucaria bachmannii Zschacke (1933)
- Verrucaria badiocinerea Räsänen (1939)
- Verrucaria baetica D.S.Clemente (1867)
- Verrucaria bagliettoi Servít (1950)
- Verrucaria bakonyensis Servít (1948)
- Verrucaria balcicensis Servít (1948)
- Verrucaria baltica Zschacke (1928)
- Verrucaria banatica Servít (1948)
- Verrucaria barrandei Servít (1949)
- Verrucaria basaltica Servít (1950)
- Verrucaria baumgartneri Zahlbr. (1905)
- Verrucaria bella Zahlbr. (1930)
- Verrucaria bernaicensis Malbr. (1869)
- Verrucaria bernardinensis Breuss (2007)
- Verrucaria bicincta Zahlbr. (1938)
- Verrucaria bifurcata Pykälä, Kantelinen & Myllys (2020) – Finland
- Verrucaria bigorrensis Zschacke (1933)
- Verrucaria bisagnoensis Servít (1949)
- Verrucaria boblensis Servít (1948)
- Verrucaria boccana Servít (1949)
- Verrucaria borealis Servít (1950)
- Verrucaria bosniaca Servít (1939)
- Verrucaria brachyspora Arnold (1890)
- Verrucaria breussii Diederich & van den Boom (2011)
- Verrucaria brunneola Malme (1937)
- Verrucaria bryoctona (Th.Fr.) Orange (1991)
- Verrucaria bubalina H.Mayrhofer & P.M.McCarthy (1991) – Macquarie Island
- Verrucaria buekkensis Servít (1949)
- Verrucaria buellioides Servít (1949)
- Verrucaria buelliicola P.M.McCarthy (2003) – Australia
- Verrucaria bulbalina P.M.McCarthy (1991) – Macquarie Island
- Verrucaria bulgarica Szatala (1930)
- Verrucaria bullata Lynge (1928)

== C ==
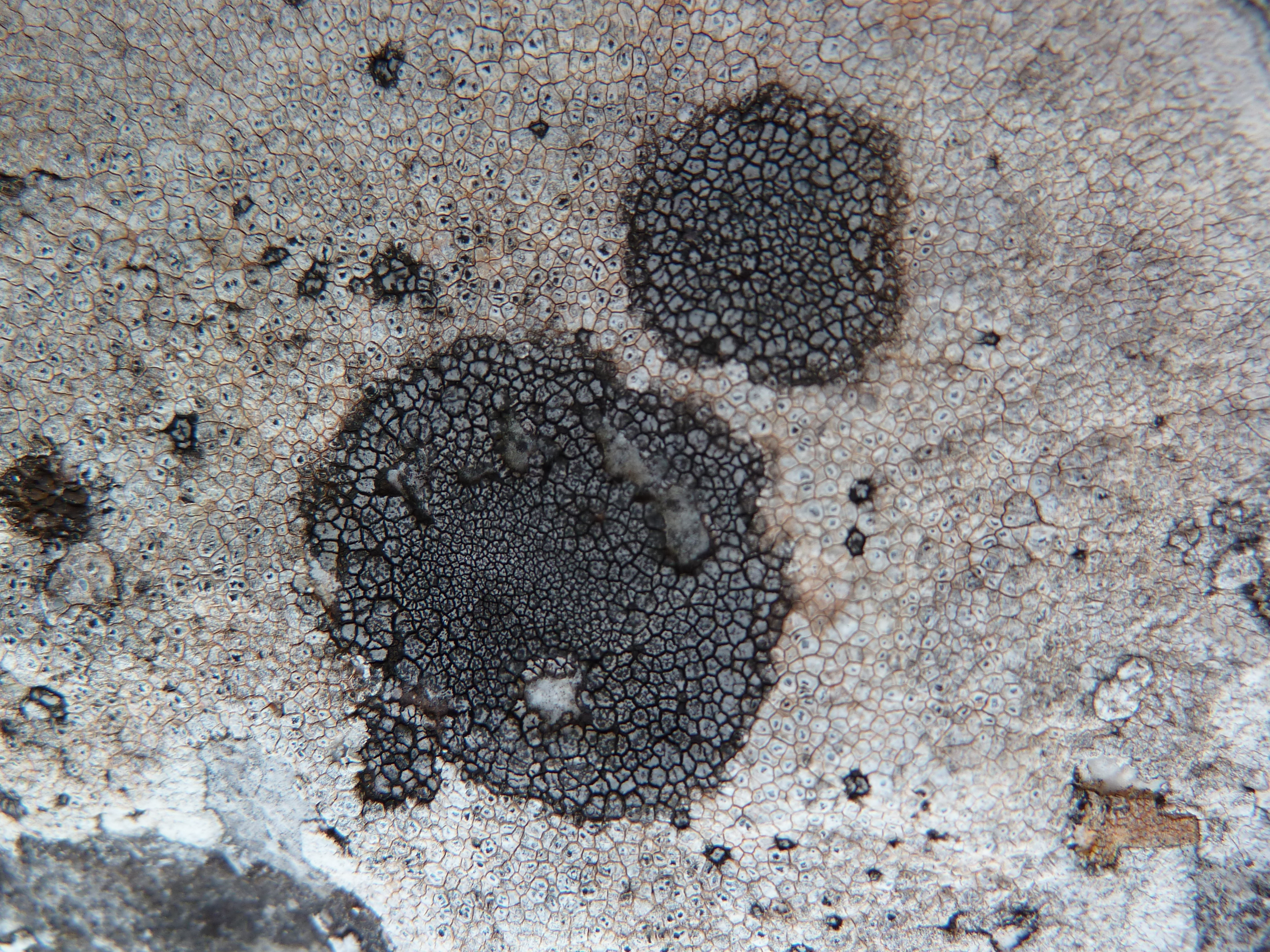
Verrucaria canella

- Verrucaria caduca Fée (1825)
- Verrucaria caecula Servít (1950)
- Verrucaria caesiocinerata Zahlbr. (1930)
- Verrucaria caesionigrans Nyl. (1874)
- Verrucaria caesiopsila Anzi (1864)
- Verrucaria calcicola Nyl. (1888)
- Verrucaria caliacraensis Servít (1950)
- Verrucaria calkinsiana Servít (1950)
- Verrucaria cambrinii Servít (1953)
- Verrucaria canella Nyl. (1883)
- Verrucaria capitellata Hoffm. (1796)
- Verrucaria capitulata H.Harada (2012)
- Verrucaria carbonella Nyl. (1861)
- Verrucaria carbonusta Breuss (2013) – United States
- Verrucaria carrissoi Samp. (1922)
- Verrucaria cassiae Spreng. (1807)
- Verrucaria castaneorubra Maheu & A.Gillet (1926)
- Verrucaria cataleptiza Servít (1946)
- Verrucaria cataractophila Servít (1953)

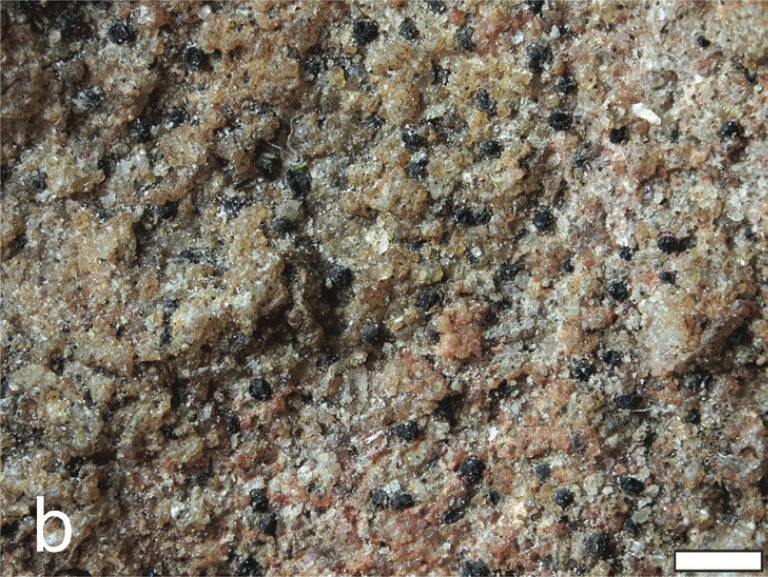
Verrucaria cavernarum

- Verrucaria cavernarum Pykälä & Myllys (2020) – Finland
- Verrucaria cernaensis Zschacke (1927) – Europe
- Verrucaria cernohorskyi Servít (1950)
- Verrucaria cetera Breuss (1998)
- Verrucaria cetrariicola Nyl. ex Norrl. (1874)
- Verrucaria ceuthocarpa Wahlenb. (1803)
- Verrucaria chiloensis Zahlbr. (1917)
- Verrucaria chloritis Stizenb. (1895)
- Verrucaria chlorospiloides Nyl. (1888)
- Verrucaria christiansenii Servít (1952)
- Verrucaria cicatricosa Hoffm. (1796)
- Verrucaria cincta Ramond (1827)
- Verrucaria cinereoatra Hoffm. (1787)
- Verrucaria cinereolimbata Servít (1949)
- Verrucaria cinereolurida Vain. (1921)
- Verrucaria cinereolutescens Zschacke (1927)
- Verrucaria circumpressa Nyl. (1888)
- Verrucaria circumscripta Chaub. ex St.-Amans (1821)
- Verrucaria coerulea DC. (1805)
- Verrucaria collematodes Garov. (1865)
- Verrucaria commutata Zschacke (1933)
- Verrucaria compaginata Zahlbr. (1930)
- Verrucaria conchea Servít (1952)
- Verrucaria conchicola Erichsen (1943)
- Verrucaria congestula Stirt. ex Cromb. (1877)
- Verrucaria conoidella Nyl. (1885)
- Verrucaria consociata Servít (1951)
- Verrucaria constantinensis Servít (1953)
- Verrucaria constricta Zschacke (1933)
- Verrucaria contardonis Servít (1953)
- Verrucaria contortoides Servít (1946)
- Verrucaria contraria H.Magn. (1940)
- Verrucaria controversella Servít (1946)
- Verrucaria conturmatula Nyl. (1879)
- Verrucaria cootapatambensis P.M.McCarthy (2002) – Australia
- Verrucaria corallensis P.M.McCarthy (2008) – Australia
- Verrucaria corcontica Servít (1950)
- Verrucaria corrosa Jatta (1911)
- Verrucaria corticata Anzi (1864)
- Verrucaria cotacea Lamy (1880)
- Verrucaria cothenensis Zschacke (1933)
- Verrucaria cramba Stirt. (1877)
- Verrucaria crassa Eschw. (1833)
- Verrucaria craterigera H.Harada (2012)
- Verrucaria cretophila Oxner (1955)
- Verrucaria crozalsii B.de Lesd. (1932)
- Verrucaria cuprea Eschw. (1828)
- Verrucaria cupreocervina Zahlbr. (1930)
- Verrucaria cylindrophora Vain. (1903)

== D ==
- Verrucaria dacryodes Nyl. (1903)
- Verrucaria dagolavii Fryday (2015) – South Africa
- Verrucaria dalamatica Servít (1936)
- Verrucaria dalejensis Servít (1952)
- Verrucaria dalmatica Servít (1936)
- Verrucaria dalslandensis Servít (1952)
- Verrucaria danica Servít & M.S.Christ. (1955)
- Verrucaria danubica Servít (1946)
- Verrucaria davosiensis Zschacke (1927)
- Verrucaria dechyi Vain. (1899)
- Verrucaria deckeri O.Behr (1954)
- Verrucaria decussata Garov. (1865)
- Verrucaria deformis Zschacke (1927)
- Verrucaria degelii R.Sant. (1939)
- Verrucaria delita Nyl. (1876)
- Verrucaria delitescens Servít (1948)
- Verrucaria demissa A.Massal. ex Arnold (1858)
- Verrucaria depressa Meyen & Flot. (1843)
- Verrucaria dermatoidea Servít (1948)
- Verrucaria desertorum Servít (1948)
- Verrucaria despecta Servít (1953)
- Verrucaria devensis (G.Salisb.) Orange (2014)
- Verrucaria diabasica Servít (1952)
- Verrucaria diaphragmata Zschacke (1933)
- Verrucaria dictyospora Stizenb. (1882)
- Verrucaria diesparmena Zschacke (1933)
- Verrucaria difficilis Pykälä & Myllys (2020) – Finland
- Verrucaria diffracta Anzi (1860)
- Verrucaria dilacerata Zschacke (1933)
- Verrucaria dinarica Zahlbr. (1919)
- Verrucaria diplotommoides Servít (1952)
- Verrucaria discernenda Zschacke (1933)
- Verrucaria discreta Metzler ex Nyl. (1879)
- Verrucaria dispartita Vain. (1903)
- Verrucaria dissipata Erichsen (1941)
- Verrucaria ditmarsica Erichsen (1937)
- Verrucaria divergens Nyl. (1872)
- Verrucaria dolosa Hepp (1860)
- Verrucaria dominans Stizenb. (1882)
- Verrucaria dunkerquensis Servít (1952)
- Verrucaria durietzii I.M.Lamb (1948)

== E ==
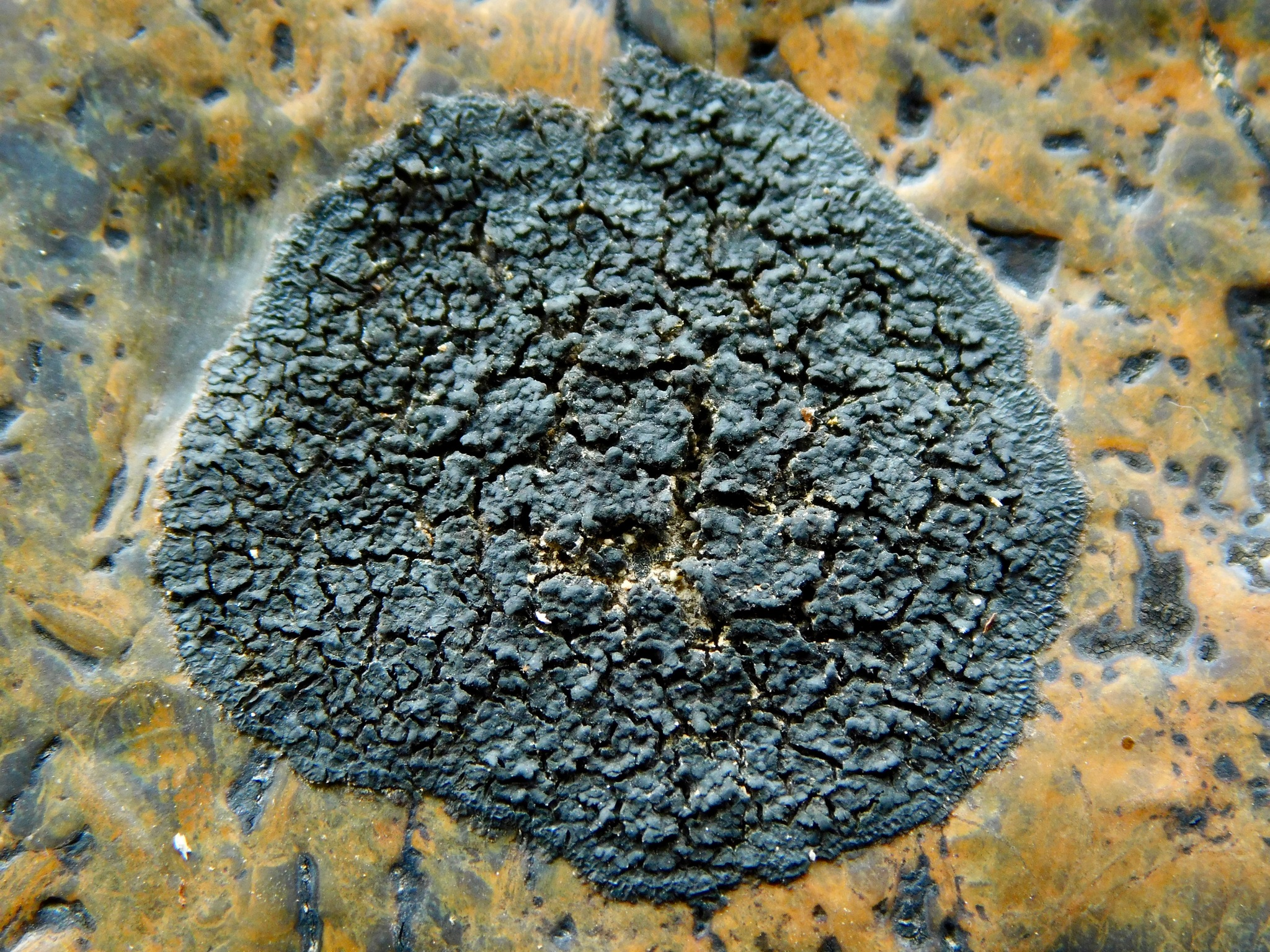
Verrucaria epimaura

- Verrucaria echinocarpa Servít (1949)
- Verrucaria efflorescens Øvstedal (2007) – Prince Edward Islands
- Verrucaria eggerthii J.Steiner (1911)
- Verrucaria eidorensis Erichsen (1940)
- Verrucaria elaeina Borrer (1813)
- Verrucaria elaeomelaena (A.Massal.) Arnold (1868)
- Verrucaria elaeoplaca Vain. (1903)
- Verrucaria elaverica M.S.Christ. (1956)
- Verrucaria eminens B.G.Lee & Hur (2018) – China
- Verrucaria endocarpoides Servít (1952)
- Verrucaria endolithioides Servít (1948)
- Verrucaria epilithea Vain. (1921)
- Verrucaria epimaura Brodo (1997) – Canada
- Verrucaria erichsenii Zschacke (1928)
- Verrucaria erodens Müll.Arg. (1888)
- Verrucaria erubescens Zschacke (1927)
- Verrucaria eusebii Servít (1950)
- Verrucaria evanidula Nyl. (1887)
- Verrucaria ewersii P.M.McCarthy (2021)
- Verrucaria exigua D.S.Clemente (1867)
- Verrucaria exquisita Darb. (1912)
- Verrucaria extrema Th.Fr. (1867)

== F ==
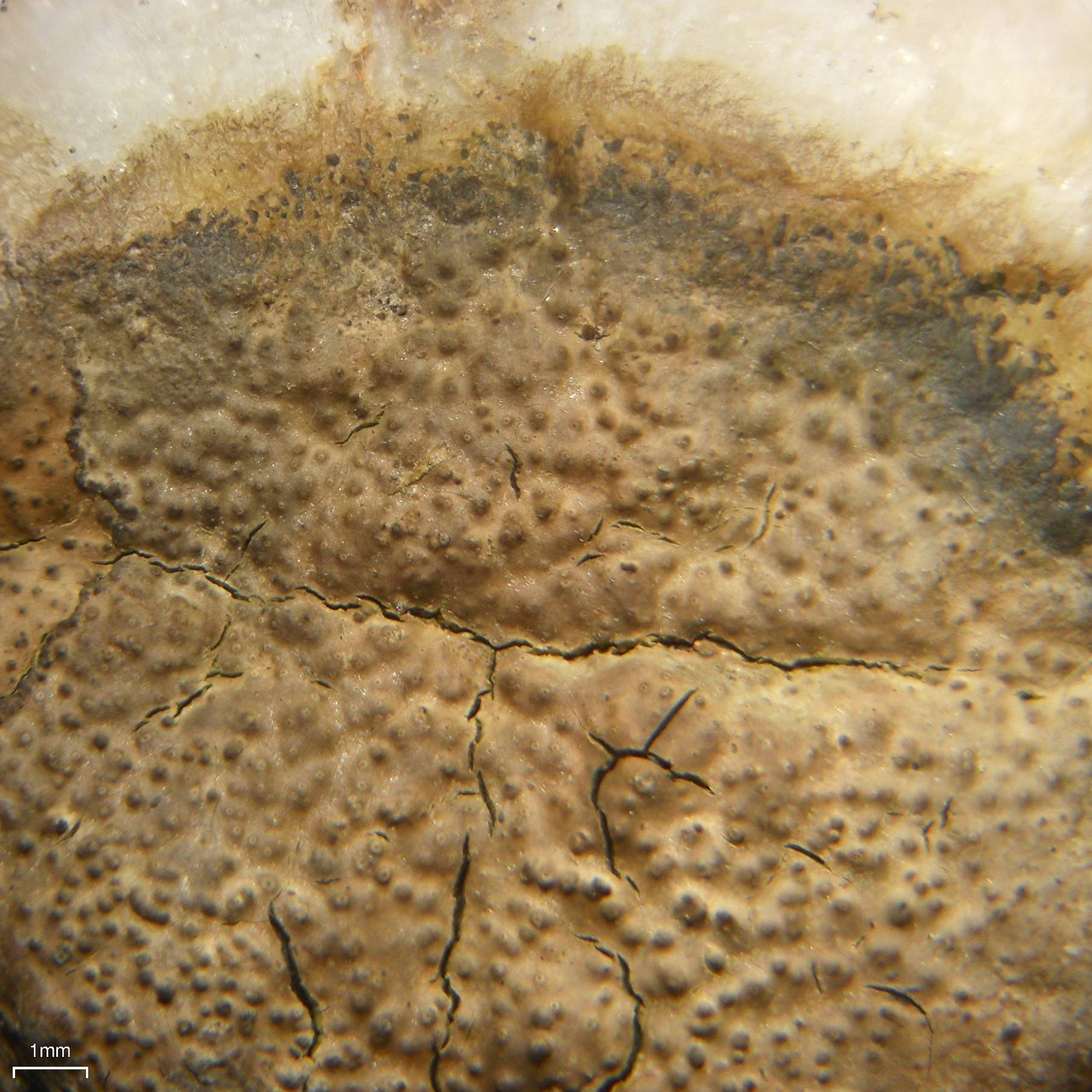
Verrucaria funckii

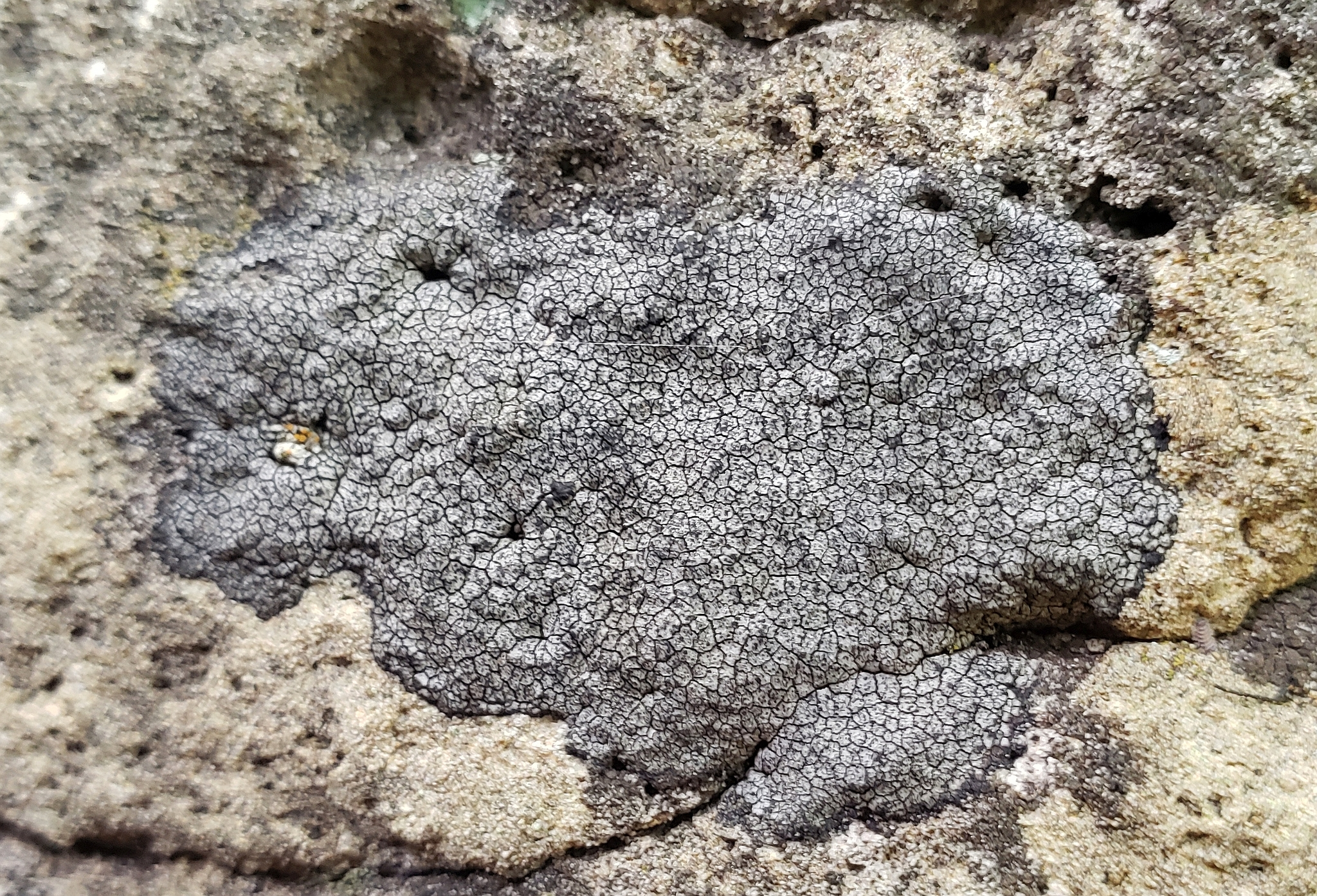
Verrucaria fuscellum

- Verrucaria falcata Breuss (2007)
- Verrucaria famelica Darb. (1912)
- Verrucaria farinosa Hoffm. (1796)
- Verrucaria fascensis Servít (1950)
- Verrucaria fatrae-magnae Servít (1954)
- Verrucaria fatrana Servít (1954)
- Verrucaria ferratensis Servít (1949)
- Verrucaria filarszkyana Szatala (1931)
- Verrucaria finitima Breuss & F.Berger (2012)
- Verrucaria finkiana Servít (1950)
- Verrucaria finnmarkica Zschacke (1933)
- Verrucaria fiordlandica P.M.McCarthy & P.N.Johnson (1995)
- Verrucaria fischeri Müll.Arg. (1868)
- Verrucaria flageyana Servít (1948)
- Verrucaria floerkei Trevis. (1860)
- Verrucaria florentina Zschacke (1934)
- Verrucaria fortuita P.M.McCarthy (2000) – Rarotonga
- Verrucaria fraudulenta J.Steiner (1898)
- Verrucaria fulva Hoffm. (1796)
- Verrucaria funckiana Servít (1950)
- Verrucaria funckii (Spreng.) Zahlbr. (1921)
- Verrucaria funebris Zahlbr. (1930)
- Verrucaria fuscatula Servít (1946)
- Verrucaria fuscella (Turner) Winch (1807)
- Verrucaria fuscescens Servít (1948)
- Verrucaria fuscolurida Vain. (1921)
- Verrucaria fusconigrescens Nyl. (1872)
- Verrucaria fuscovelutina Servít (1949)
- Verrucaria fuscozonata Pykälä, Kantelinen & Myllys (2020) – Finland
- Verrucaria fusiformis Leight. (1851)

== G ==
- Verrucaria gaditana D.S.Clemente (1867)
- Verrucaria galactina Ach. (1814)
- Verrucaria galactinella Servít (1948)
- Verrucaria gattefossei Werner (1955)
- Verrucaria gebennica Nyl. (1898)
- Verrucaria gemmifera Taylor (1836)
- Verrucaria geomelaena Anzi (1864)
- Verrucaria gibelliana Garov. (1865)
- Verrucaria glarensis Servít (1948)
- Verrucaria glaucelloides Hepp (1862)
- Verrucaria glaucina Ach. (1810)
- Verrucaria glaucinodes Nyl. (1890)
- Verrucaria glaucodes Nyl. (1872)
- Verrucaria glauconephela Nyl. (1881)
- Verrucaria glaucoplacoides Darb. (1912)
- Verrucaria glaucovirens Grummann (1963)
- Verrucaria globulans Zahlbr. (1936)
- Verrucaria glowackii Servít (1946)
- Verrucaria gongshanensis H.Harada & Li S.Wang (2008) – China
- Verrucaria gorzegnoensis Servít (1952)
- Verrucaria gotlandica Servít (1952)
- Verrucaria graniformis Baumg. (1790)
- Verrucaria granitica Servít (1950)
- Verrucaria gravosana Servít (1948)
- Verrucaria grossa Nyl. (1859)
- Verrucaria gudbrandsdalensis Zschacke ex H.Magn. (1932)
- Verrucaria guestphalica Servít (1954)
- Verrucaria guttata Hoffm. (1796)
- Verrucaria gypsophila Zschacke (1933)

== H ==
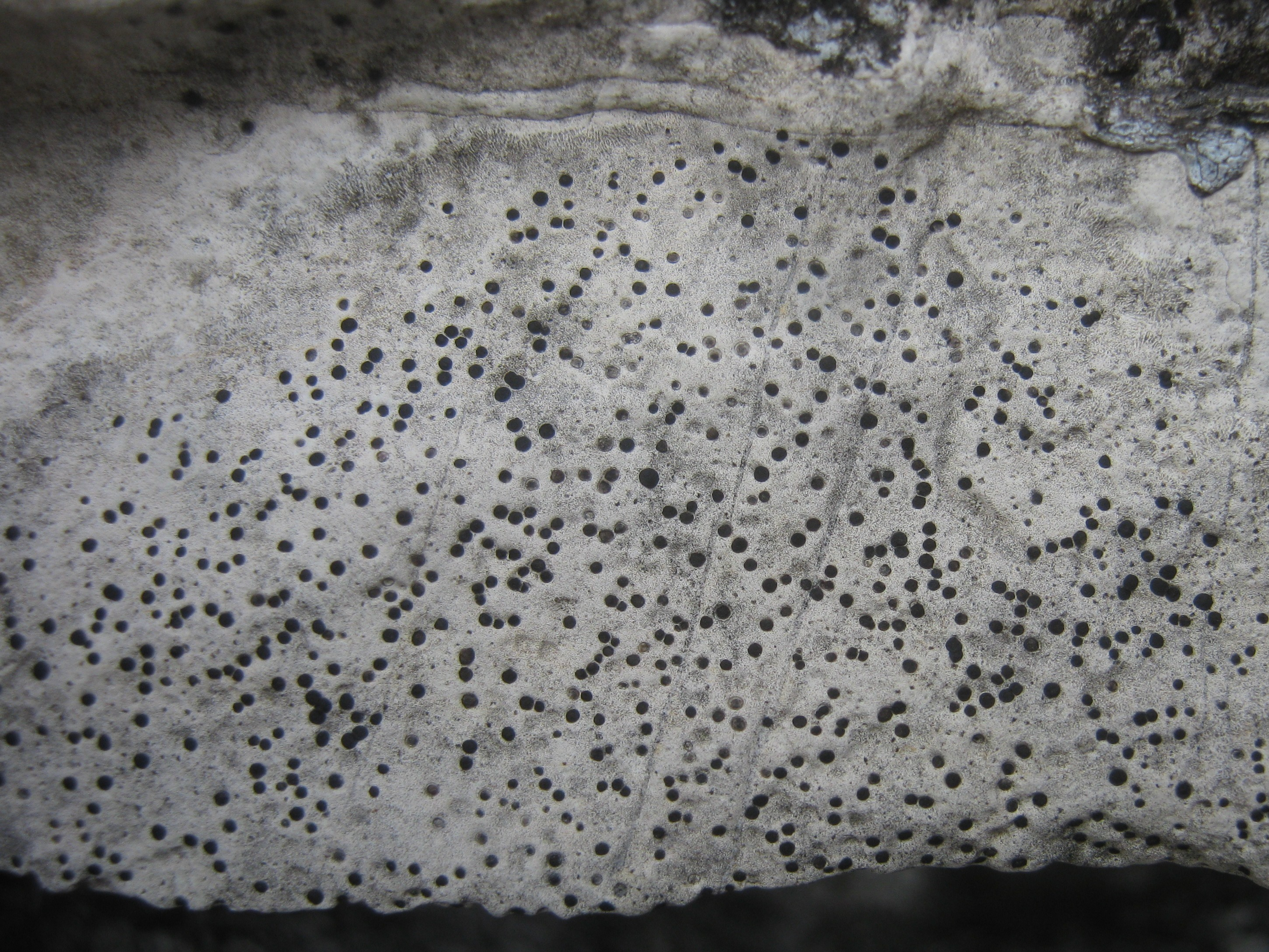
Verrucaria hochstetteri, Portugal

- Verrucaria haeyrenii Erichsen (1937)
- Verrucaria hakulinenii Pykälä & Myllys (2024) – Finland
- Verrucaria halizoa Leight. (1871) – Europe
- Verrucaria halochlora H.Harada (1995) – Japan
- Verrucaria handelii Zahlbr. (1930)
- Verrucaria harmandii B.de Lesd. (1910)
- Verrucaria harzynica Zschacke (1933)
- Verrucaria hebena C.W.Dodge (1948)
- Verrucaria helsingiensis Vain. (1921)
- Verrucaria helvelloides F.H. Wigg. (1780)
- Verrucaria helvetica B. de Lesd. (1932)
- Verrucaria hemisphaerica Servít (1949)
- Verrucaria hepatica Jatta (1900)
- Verrucaria hercegensis Servít (1948)
- Verrucaria hilitzeriana Servít (1949)
- Verrucaria hochstetteri Fr. (1831)
- Verrucaria honghensis H.Harada & Li S.Wang (2008) – China
- Verrucaria horizontalis Zschacke (1933)
- Verrucaria howensis P.M.McCarthy (1990) – Australia
- Verrucaria humida Orange (2015)
- Verrucaria humosimilis Hoffm. (1796)
- Verrucaria hunsrueckensis Thüs, Killmann, Leh & Eb. Fisch. (2018)
- Verrucaria hybernica Servít (1955)
- Verrucaria hydrela Ach. (1814)
- Verrucaria hydrophila Orange (2013) – Europe
- Verrucaria hypophaeodes Zschacke (1934)

== I ==
- Verrucaria ifranensis Werner (1932)
- Verrucaria igii H.Harada (1996)
- Verrucaria illinoisensis Servít (1950)
- Verrucaria imitatoria Servít (1955)
- Verrucaria imperfecta Servít (1952)
- Verrucaria inaequalis H.Magn. (1940)
- Verrucaria inaspecta Servít (1952)
- Verrucaria incertula Zahlbr. (1921)
- Verrucaria incompta Servít (1953)
- Verrucaria inconstans P.M.McCarthy (1995) – Australia
- Verrucaria incrassata Breuss (2007)
- Verrucaria incrustata D.S.Clemente (1867)
- Verrucaria infidula Zschacke (1933)
- Verrucaria inflata Stirt. (1877)
- Verrucaria infumata Nyl. (1881)
- Verrucaria innata Nyl. (1858)
- Verrucaria inornata Servít (1950)
- Verrucaria inquilina P.M.McCarthy (2010) – Australia
- Verrucaria insculptella Servít (1952)
- Verrucaria insuccata Erichsen (1939)
- Verrucaria internigrescens (Nyl.) Erichsen (1928)
- Verrucaria invenusta H.Magn. (1952)
- Verrucaria inverecundula Pykälä & Myllys (2019) – Europe
- Verrucaria iowensis Servít (1950)
- Verrucaria irmscheriana Erichsen (1939)
- Verrucaria irrigua Taylor (1836)
- Verrucaria italica (B.de Lesd.) Servít (1952)
- Verrucaria iwatsukii H.Harada (1994)
- Verrucaria izuensis H.Harada (2012)

== J ==
- Verrucaria javorinae Servít (1949)
- Verrucaria jerichoensis Servít (1948)
- Verrucaria jerusalemica Servít (1950)
- Verrucaria juankoskiensis Pykälä & Myllys (2019) – Europe
- Verrucaria judaica Servít (1948)
- Verrucaria juglandis Gasparyan & Aptroot (2016) – Armenia
- Verrucaria jurana Zschacke (1927)
- Verrucaria juumaensis Pykälä & Myllys (2024) – Finland

== K ==
- Verrucaria kalenskyi Servít (1951)
- Verrucaria karelica Vain. (1921)
- Verrucaria keissleri Szatala (1931)
- Verrucaria kerguelana Nyl. (1876)
- Verrucaria kerguelensis C.W.Dodge (1948)
- Verrucaria kiskoensis Pykälä & Myllys (2019) – Europe
- Verrucaria kiyosumiensis H.Harada (2001) – Japan
- Verrucaria kiyosumiensis H.Harada (2001)
- Verrucaria klementii Servít (1948)
- Verrucaria knowlesiae P.M.McCarthy (1988)
- Verrucaria kondaensis Vain. (1928)
- Verrucaria kootenaica Breuss & T.Sprib. (2001) – United States
- Verrucaria kowenensis P.M.McCarthy (2020)
- Verrucaria krempelhuberi Lindau (1913)
- Verrucaria kuemmerleana Servít (1949)
- Verrucaria kukunorensis H.Magn. (1940)
- Verrucaria kutakii Servít (1946)
- Verrucaria kuusamoensis Pykälä, Kantelinen & Myllys (2020) – Finland

== L ==
- Verrucaria lactea Orange (2022) – Nepal
- Verrucaria lapidicola Orange (2014)
- Verrucaria lapponica Pykälä (2017) – Finland
- Verrucaria latebrosa Körb. (1855)
- Verrucaria latericola Erichsen (1943)
- Verrucaria linkolae Pykälä & Myllys (2024) – Finland
- Verrucaria lohjaensis Pykälä & Myllys (2024) – Finland
- Verrucaria luchunensis H.Harada & Li S.Wang (2008) – China

== M ==
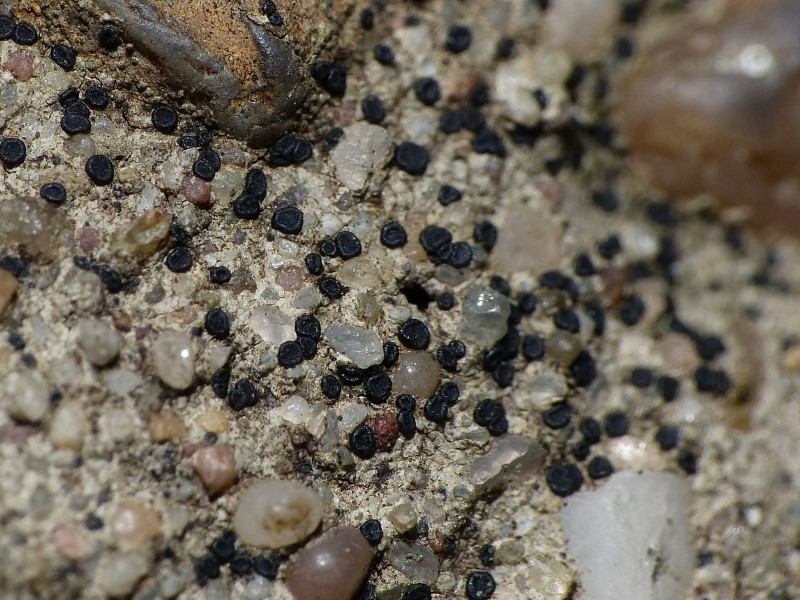
Verrucaria muralis

- Verrucaria macrostoma DC. (1805)
- Verrucaria maculicarpa Breuss (2007)
- Verrucaria madida Orange (2004) – Europe
- Verrucaria margacea (Wahlenb.) Wahlenb. (1812)
- Verrucaria mawsonii C.W.Dodge (1948)
- Verrucaria meridionalis P.M.McCarthy (1994) – Australia
- Verrucaria microsporoides Nyl. (1863)
- Verrucaria miyagiensis H.Harada (2000) – Japan
- Verrucaria modica Pykälä & Myllys (2019) – Europe
- Verrucaria mollis Taylor (1836)
- Verrucaria mundula P.M.McCarthy (1995) – Australia
- Verrucaria muralis Ach. (1803)
- Verrucaria murina Leight. (1851)

== N ==
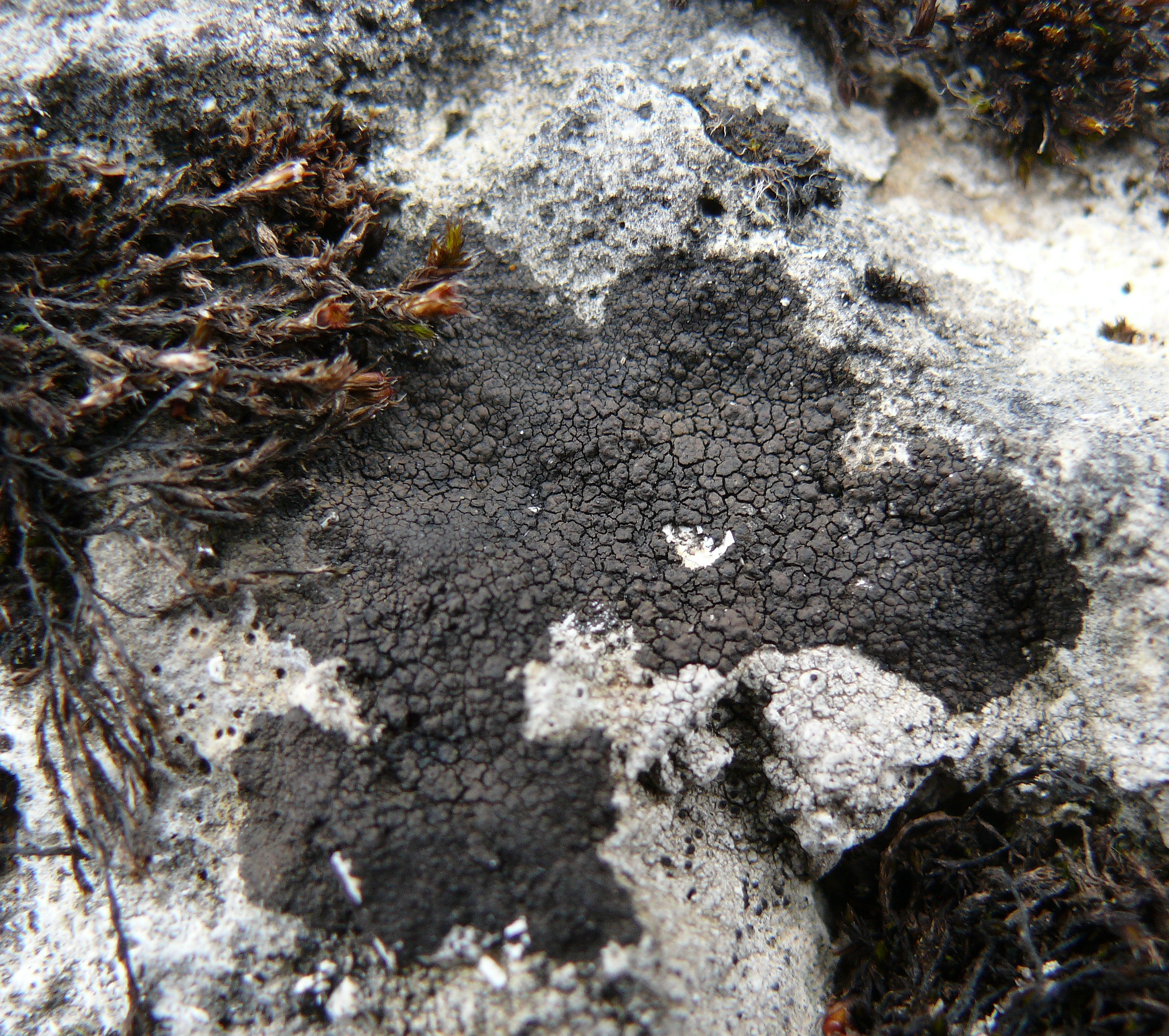
Verrucaria nigrescens

- Verrucaria nigrescens Pers. (1795)
- Verrucaria nodosa Orange (2013) – Europe
- Verrucaria norrlinii Pykälä & Myllys (2024) – Finland
- Verrucaria nujiangensis H.Harada & Li S.Wang (2008) – China

== O ==
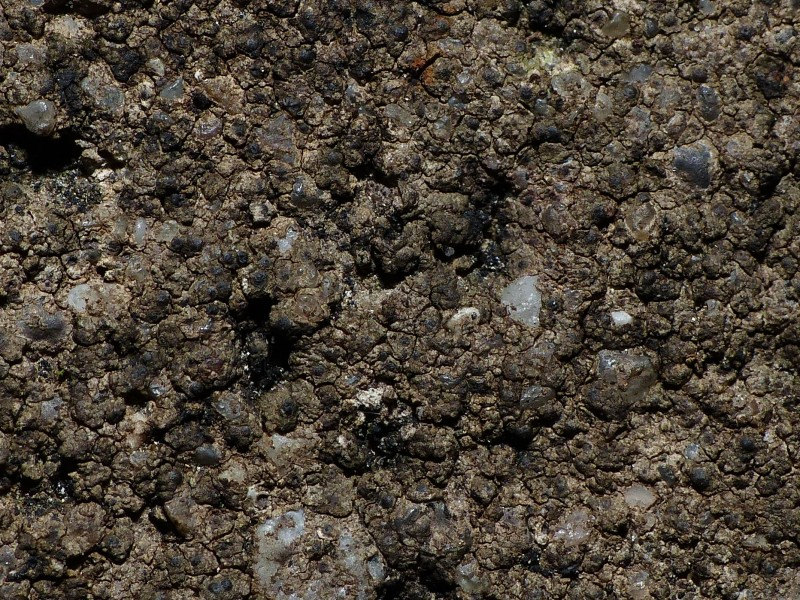
Verrucaria ochrostoma

- Verrucaria ochrostoma Borrer (1836)
- Verrucaria othmarbreussii Pykälä & Myllys (2017) – Finland
- Verrucaria othmarii K.Knudsen & Arcadia (2012)
- Verrucaria oulankaensis Pykälä & Myllys (2017) – Finland
- Verrucaria oulankajokiensis Pykälä & Myllys (2024) – Finland

== P ==
- Verrucaria pachyderma Arnold (1881)
- Verrucaria parvipeltata Orange (2022) – Nepal
- Verrucaria paulula Sandst. (1925)
- Verrucaria phaeoderma P.M.McCarthy (1995) – Australia
- Verrucaria phaeosperma Arnold (1874)
- Verrucaria pinguicula A.Massal. (1856)
- Verrucaria placida Orange (2013) – Europe
- Verrucaria placodioides Øvstedal (2018) – Kerguelen Islands
- Verrucaria placynthii Alstrup & E.S.Hansen (2001) – Greenland
- Verrucaria pluviosilvestris P.M.McCarthy (2008) – Australia
- Verrucaria polysticta Borrer (1834)
- Verrucaria praetermissa (Trevis.) Anzi (1864)
- Verrucaria praeviella H.Harada (2000) – Japan
- Verrucaria prominula Nyl. ex Mudd (1861)
- Verrucaria psychrophila I.M.Lamb (1948)
- Verrucaria puncticulata (P.M.McCarthy) P.M.McCarthy (1995) – Australia

== Q ==
- Verrucaria quercina Breuss (2007)

== R ==
- Verrucaria raesaenenii Pykälä & Myllys (2019) – Europe
- Verrucaria rhizicola Aptroot & Thüs (2011) – France
- Verrucaria rosula Orange (2013) – Europe
- Verrucaria rupestris Schrad. (1794)

== S ==
- Verrucaria saanaensis Pykälä (2017) – Finland
- Verrucaria sandstedei B.de Lesd. (1912)
- Verrucaria sanrikuensis H.Harada (2000) – Japan
- Verrucaria schofieldii Brodo (1997) – Canada
- Verrucaria senta Orange (2022) – Nepal
- Verrucaria serpuloides I.M.Lamb (1948) – Antarctica
- Verrucaria sessilis P.M.McCarthy (1991) – New Zealand
- Verrucaria simplex P.M.McCarthy (1988) – Europe
- Verrucaria solicola P.M.McCarthy (1996) – Australia
- Verrucaria squamulosa M.Brand & van den Boom (2003) – Europe
- Verrucaria subdiscreta P.M.McCarthy (1991) – Australia
- Verrucaria subdevergens Pykälä & Myllys (2020) – Finland
- Verrucaria subdivisa Breuss (2007)
- Verrucaria sublapponica Pykälä & Myllys (2017) – Finland
- Verrucaria sublobulata Eitner ex Servít (1950)
- Verrucaria subtholocarpa P.M.McCarthy & Kantvilas (2001)

== T ==
- Verrucaria takagoensis H.Harada (2001) – Japan
- Verrucaria tallbackaensis Pykälä, Launis & Myllys (2019) – Europe
- Verrucaria tasmanica P.M.McCarthy (1995) – Australia
- Verrucaria tenebrosa Pykälä, Launis & Myllys (2018)
- Verrucaria tesselatula Nyl. (1875)
- Verrucaria thalassina (Zahlbr.) Zschacke (1933)
- Verrucaria tholocarpa P.M.McCarthy (1995) – Australia
- Verrucaria thujae Lendemer & Breuss (2009) – North America
- Verrucaria tuberculiformis P.M.McCarthy & Kantvilas (2001)

== V ==
- Verrucaria vacillans Pykälä & Myllys (2020) – Finland
- Verrucaria vainioi Pykälä & Myllys (2024) – Finland
- Verrucaria viridula (Schrad.) Ach. (1803)
- Verrucaria vitikainenii Pykälä, Launis & Myllys (2017) – Finland

== X ==
- Verrucaria xyloxena Norman (1867)

== Y ==
- Verrucaria yoshimurae H.Harada (2011) – Japan
