= Verrucaria kiyosumiensis =

Scientific classification
- Kingdom: Fungi
- Division: Ascomycota
- Class: Eurotiomycetes
- Order: Verrucariales
- Family: Verrucariaceae
- Genus: Verrucaria
- Species: V. kiyosumiensis

Binomial name
- Verrucaria kiyosumiensis H.Harada (2001)

Species of lichen

Verrucaria kiyosumiensis is a species saxicolous (rock-dwelling), crustose lichen in the family Verrucariaceae. Found in semi-freshwater habitats in Chiba Prefecture, central Japan, it was formally described as a new species in 2001 by lichenologist Hiroshi Harada. The lichen has almost spherical, exposed black perithecia measuring 0.15–0.25 mm in diameter, and dark purplish brown perithecial walls lacking a distinct involucrellum. The periphyses are 10–15 μm long with pointed apices, and its ascospores have dimensions of 12–16 by 5–7 μm. The lichen has an indistinct thallus.

== See also ==
- List of Verrucaria species
