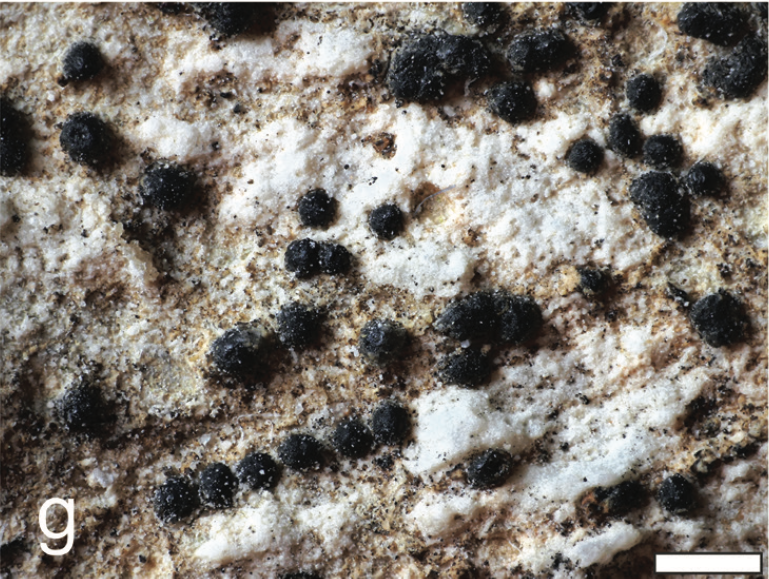
- Image of holotype specimen; scale bar = 0.5 mm

Scientific classification
- Kingdom: Fungi
- Division: Ascomycota
- Class: Eurotiomycetes
- Order: Verrucariales
- Family: Verrucariaceae
- Genus: Verrucaria
- Species: V. vacillans

Binomial name
- Verrucaria vacillans Pykälä & Myllys (2020)
- Holotype: Enontekiö, Finland

= Verrucaria vacillans =

Species of lichen

Verrucaria vacillans is a species of saxicolous (rock-dwelling) crustose lichen in the family Verrucariaceae. It is only known to occur in the Enontekiö Lapland region of northwestern Finland.

== Taxonomy ==
Verrucaria vacillans was described as new to science in 2020 by the Finnish lichenologists Juha Pykälä, Annina Kantelinen and Leena Myllys. It belongs to the genus Verrucaria, a group of lichens characterised by their small, flask-shaped fruiting bodies (perithecia) and crustose growth form. While it shares morphological similarities with several other Verrucaria species, particularly those in the V. subtilis complex, V. vacillans is genetically distinct. DNA analysis of the internal transcribed spacer region shows a sequence divergence of 4.5–6.8% from its closest relatives, supporting its status as a separate species.

== Description ==
The thallus (lichen body) of Verrucaria vacillans is typically white, whitish-grey or pale brownish in colour. It is primarily endolithic (growing within the rock) but can sometimes be thinly epilithic (growing on the surface). A distinctive feature of this species is the presence of dark lines between adjacent thalli, which can be quite pronounced.

The perithecia are small to medium-sized (0.15–0.47 mm in diameter) and partially immersed in the rock substrate, usually leaving shallow to fairly deep pits. They occur in relatively high densities, with 60–200 perithecia per square centimetre.

A key diagnostic feature of V. vacillans, reflected in its species epithet, is its highly variable involucrellum (the outer layer covering the perithecium). The involucrellum can range from apical (covering only the top) to reaching the base of the perithecium, and its thickness and orientation relative to the exciple (inner layer) are also variable. The spores of V. vacillans are moderately large, measuring 18–32 μm long and 8–15 μm wide. They are non-septate (lacking internal divisions) and enclosed in a thin perispore.

== Habitat and distribution ==
Verrucaria vacillans has a very specific habitat preference and distribution. It is known only from the calcareous mountains (Scandes) in northwestern Finland, specifically in the Enontekiö Lapland region. The species grows exclusively on dolomite substrates, occurring on rock outcrops, boulders, stones, and pebbles. All known specimens of V. vacillans have been found above the tree line, indicating a preference for alpine conditions.

The restricted distribution and specific habitat requirements of V. vacillans may make it vulnerable to environmental changes, particularly those affecting alpine ecosystems. As such, it could be a species of interest for monitoring the impacts of climate change on high-altitude lichen communities.

== See also ==
- List of Verrucaria species
