= Verrucaria halizoa =

Scientific classification
- Domain: Eukaryota
- Kingdom: Fungi
- Division: Ascomycota
- Class: Eurotiomycetes
- Order: Verrucariales
- Family: Verrucariaceae
- Genus: Verrucaria
- Species: V. halizoa

Binomial name
- Verrucaria halizoa Leight. (1871)

Synonyms
- List: Arthopyrenia halizoa (Leight.) Arnold (1891); Thelidium halizoa (Leight.) Eitner (1911); Verrucaria frisiaca Erichsen (1930); Verrucaria microspora f. friesiaca (Erichsen) R.Sant. (1939); Verrucaria microspora var. friesiaca (Erichsen) Erichsen (1941); Verrucaria mackenzie-lambii Erichsen (1940); Verrucaria cribbii R.W.Rogers (1988)

Species of lichen

Verrucaria halizoa is a widespread species of saxicolous (rock-dwelling), crustose lichen in the family Verrucariaceae. It was formally described as a new species in 1871 by William Allport Leighton. The lichen has a thin, superficial thallus that is pale olive-green to brown in colour; it lacks ridges or punctae. The thallus is somewhat gelatinous, and more or less translucent when moist. It grows in shaded nooks and crannies among seashore rocks, in the mid-littoral zone. The widely distributed species occurs in Asia, Australia, Europe, North America, the subantarctic islands, and Antarctica.

== See also ==
- List of Verrucaria species
