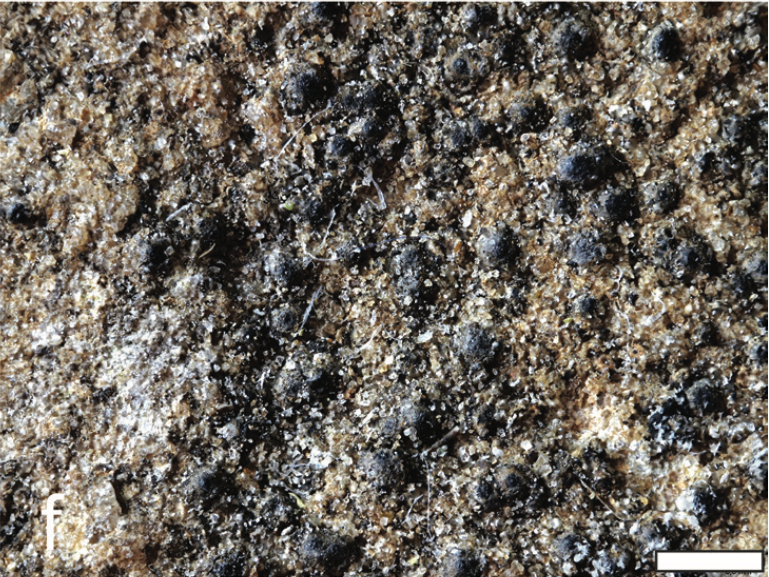
- Image of holotype specimen; scale bar = 0.5 mm

Scientific classification
- Kingdom: Fungi
- Division: Ascomycota
- Class: Eurotiomycetes
- Order: Verrucariales
- Family: Verrucariaceae
- Genus: Verrucaria
- Species: V. subdevergens

Binomial name
- Verrucaria subdevergens Pykälä & Myllys (2020)
- Holotype: Oulanka National Park, Finland

= Verrucaria subdevergens =

Species of lichen

Verrucaria subdevergens is a species of saxicolous (rock-dwelling) crustose lichen in the family Verrucariaceae. It occurs in northeastern Finland.

== Taxonomy ==
Verrucaria subdevergens was described as new to science in 2020 by the Finnish lichenologists Juha Pykälä and Leena Myllys. It belongs to the genus Verrucaria, a group of lichens characterised by their small, flask-shaped fruiting bodies (perithecia) and crustose growth form. It is closely related to V. devergens and V. karelica, forming part of the "V. devergens complex". The species epithet subdevergens reflects its close relationship to V. devergens. Despite its morphological similarities to these species, V. subdevergens is genetically distinct, with DNA analysis of the internal transcribed spacer region showing a sequence divergence of 5.4–6.0% from its closest relative, V. kuusamoensis.

== Description ==
The thallus (lichen body) of Verrucaria subdevergens varies in colour from white or grey to ochraceous or pale greyish-brown. It can be endolithic (growing within the rock) or thinly epilithic (growing on the surface), and its appearance ranges from continuous to irregularly cracked. In some specimens, adjacent thalli are separated by a dark line.

The perithecia are moderately large (0.21–0.42 mm in diameter) and partially immersed in the rock substrate, leaving shallow to deep pits. They are often surrounded by a collar of thalline tissue.

A key diagnostic feature of V. subdevergens is its involucrellum, an outer layer covering the perithecium. In this species, the involucrellum typically covers half or more of the perithecium's height, occasionally enveloping it entirely. This feature helps distinguish it from the closely related V. devergens, which usually has a shorter involucrellum.

The spores of V. subdevergens are large, measuring 23–35 μm long and 11–15 μm wide. They are non-septate (lacking internal divisions) and enclosed in a thin perispore.

== Habitat and distribution ==
Verrucaria subdevergens is known only from the Oulanka area in northeastern Finland, where it grows on dolomite rock outcrops and boulders. This restricted distribution parallels that of its close relatives V. devergens and V. karelica, which are also found in this region.

All three known specimens of V. subdevergens were collected from the Oulanka area in the biogeographical province of Koillismaa. This area is known for its unique geology, particularly its dolomite formations, which support a diverse and specialised lichen flora.

The limited known distribution of V. subdevergens makes it a species of potential conservation concern. Its discovery helps demonstrate the importance of the Oulanka area as a hotspot for lichen diversity, particularly for calcicolous (lime-loving) species.

== See also ==
- List of Verrucaria species
