= Verrucaria adguttata =

Scientific classification
- Kingdom: Fungi
- Division: Ascomycota
- Class: Eurotiomycetes
- Order: Verrucariales
- Family: Verrucariaceae
- Genus: Verrucaria
- Species: V. adguttata

Binomial name
- Verrucaria adguttata Zahlbr. (1941)

Species of lichen

Verrucaria adguttata is a species of crustose lichen in the family Verrucariaceae. It was first discovered growing on coastal rocks at Rangitoto Island near Auckland, where it tolerates the harsh conditions of salt spray and tidal influence. The species is be endemic to New Zealand's offshore islands.

== Taxonomy ==
Verrucaria adguttata was formally described as a new species in 1941 by the German lichenologist Alexander Zahlbruckner. The type was collected by the New Zealand botanist Harry Allan.

== Description ==
The thallus (lichen body) grows on rock and forms scattered, rounded patches that are tightly adherent to the surface. Patches are very thin, smooth, and up to about 10 mm across, with slightly undulating margins. The colour is dark brown to nearly black and almost opaque; when wetted the surface becomes faintly gelatinous. No distinct hypothallus (a border around the thallus) is present. The cortex is thin and brownish, made of densely interwoven fungal hyphae. The photosynthetic partner consists of bright-green, spherical algal cells 8–10 μm in diameter, arranged more or less in vertical series. Standard spot tests are negative (K−, C−).

Fruiting bodies (perithecia) are small, sessile, and glossy black, to about 0.25 mm in diameter, sitting free on the thallus and typically convex, with the pore only slightly depressed. The pale exciple (perithecial wall) is capped by a sooty, hemispherical involucrellum that is closely appressed almost to the base; it does not flare outwards and is truncate beneath. The internal tissue is colourless with confluent paraphyses; an iodine stain gives wine red to yellowish tones. Asci are plentiful, club-shaped, 8-spored, measuring to about 40 × 9–10 micrometres (μm). Spores are hyaline (colourless), simple (non-septate), straight, narrowly oblong-cylindrical with rounded ends, 9–11.5 × about 3 μm, generally arranged in two rows within the ascus. Asexual propagules are produced in small, half-immersed pycnidia with a shiny black top, 60–65 μm in diameter and a relatively wide pore. The conidia are very short, rod-shaped, straight to nearly straight, 2–3 μm long.

== Habitat and distribution ==
The type material was collected on stone at the edge of a salt lagoon on Rangitoto Island, Auckland. The species occupies hard coastal substrates in the supralittoral zone influenced by salt spray and periodic wetting. The lichen has also been recorded from similar habitats near Egeria Rock on Raoul Island.

== See also ==
- List of Verrucaria species
