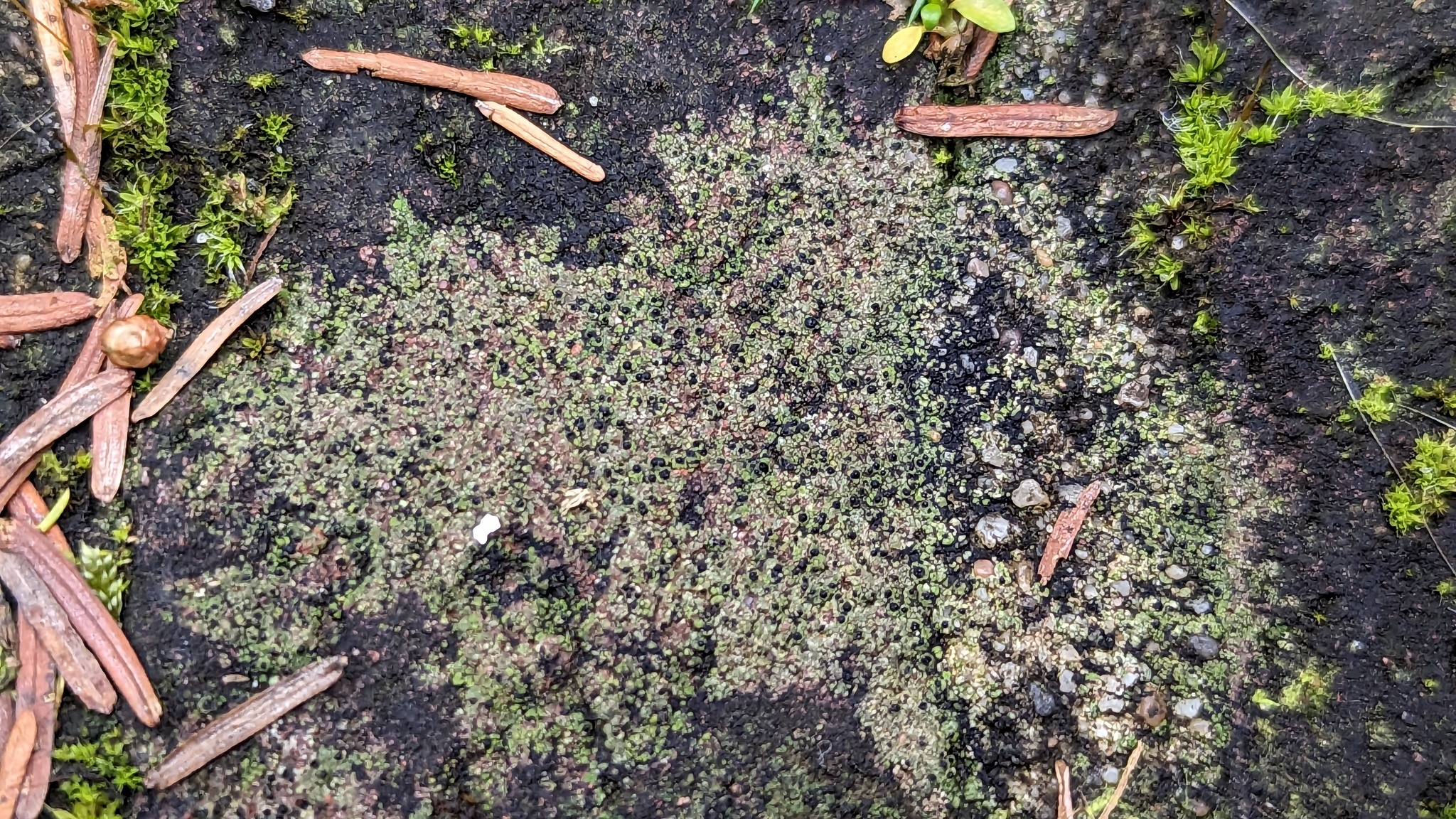

Scientific classification
- Domain: Eukaryota
- Kingdom: Fungi
- Division: Ascomycota
- Class: Eurotiomycetes
- Order: Verrucariales
- Family: Verrucariaceae
- Genus: Verrucaria
- Species: V. viridula

Binomial name
- Verrucaria viridula (Schrad.) Ach. (1803)

Synonyms
- Endocarpon viridulum Schrad. (1794); Verrucaria papillosa Ach. (1810); Verrucaria obductilis (Nyl.) Zschacke (1933)

= Verrucaria viridula =

Species of lichen

Verrucaria viridula is a common and widely distributed species of saxicolous (rock-dwelling), crustose lichen in the family Verrucariaceae. Although it is a somewhat morphologically variable species, two persistent distinguishing characteristics are its relatively large perithecia, which are often curved into a beak, and its large ascospores.

== Taxonomy ==
The lichen was first described in 1794 by German botanist Heinrich Schrader, who placed it in the genus Endocarpon. Erik Acharius transferred it to the genus Verrucaria in 1803. The name was lectotypified in 1987.

Verrucaria obductilis and Verrucaria papillosa have been shown to be synonyms of V. viridula.

== Description ==
Verrucaria viridula presents a thallus — the main body of the lichen — that is partially to entirely immersed in the cracks of its rocky substrate, sometimes only discernible as brown flecks on the surface. When it is superficial, its color can vary, most often appearing pale brown, but occasionally presenting shades of white, pale grey, or green-grey. Its areolate structure — resembling a pattern of small areas or islands — is divided by cracks, and it lacks any vegetative propagules, or structures involved in reproduction.

The perithecia, the fruiting bodies of the lichen, are embedded halfway to almost fully in the thallus. These display as convex to conical-hemispherical projections, with widths ranging from 0.15 to 0.5 mm. Their bases are immersed in the substrate. Each perithecium has an exciple — the outer protective layer of the fruiting body — which measures between 0.35 and 0.6 mm wide. The apex of the exciple extends into a short beak-like projection and is pigmented. The involucrellum, another protective layer, is weakly developed and extends from the apex of the exciple, either loosely adhering to the upper half of the exciple or slightly spreading out.

Verrucaria viridula produces ascospores that are more or less ellipsoid in shape, typically measuring between 28.5 and 34 μm in length and 14.5 to 20 μm in width. The perispore, or the outer layer of the ascospore, can sometimes be observed and measures up to 0.5 μm thick. Pycnidia, another type of fruiting body, are identifiable as dark dots up to 0.06 mm wide or larger. These produce conidia, or asexual spores, that are straight to slightly curved, measuring approximately 7 to 10 by 1 μm.

== Habitat and distribution ==
Verrucaria viridula is a widely distributed species, occurring in Africa, Asia, Australia, Europe, Macaronesia, Central America, and North America. It grows on calcareous rock.

== Species interactions ==
Opegrapha opaca is a lichenicolous (lichen-dwelling) fungus that inhabits the thallus of V. viridula, although it causes little to no discernible damage to its host. This genus-specific fungus (it has been found on other Verrucaria species as well) has been recorded from western Europe east to Israel.

== See also ==
- List of Verrucaria species
