= Verrucaria placida =

Scientific classification
- Kingdom: Fungi
- Division: Ascomycota
- Class: Eurotiomycetes
- Order: Verrucariales
- Family: Verrucariaceae
- Genus: Verrucaria
- Species: V. placida

Binomial name
- Verrucaria placida Orange (2013)

Species of lichen

Verrucaria placida is a species of saxicolous (rock-dwelling), crustose lichen in the family Verrucariaceae. Found in freshwater habitats in Europe, Verrucaria placida has been recorded in Norway, southern Germany, and Wales, where it occurs in small streams and grows on shaded siliceous rocks and stones.

== Taxonomy ==
The lichen was formally described as a new species in 2013 by the lichenologist Alan Orange. The type specimen was collected by the author south of the Moelva river in Modalen Municipality, Norway, where it was found in woodland, growing on a stone in a shaded stream. The species epithet placida, derived from the Latin word for "quiet" or "peaceful", refers to the "smooth, unbroken thallus and the characteristic but unstriking appearance of this lichen".

== Description ==
Verrucaria placida has a thin thallus measuring 26–65 μm in thickness, which has a somewhat gelatinous texture and becomes translucent when fresh and wet. The surface of the thallus is smooth with a matt or slightly glossy appearance, forming a continuous layer that varies in colour from grey-green to medium brown. When multiple thalli of the same species grow adjacent to one another, they merge without dark boundary lines separating them.

Internally, the cells of the thallus are either irregularly arranged or organized in weakly defined columns. These cells are tightly packed (coherent) without air spaces between them. The outer protective layer (cortex) is poorly differentiated, consisting of a thin layer with few or no photosynthetic partner cells (photobiont), essentially forming what specialists term a "pseudocortex". When present, the pigment in this cortical region is brown. Unlike some related species, the thallus of V. placida lacks a dark basal layer.

The reproductive structures (perithecia) form conical-hemispherical mounds measuring 400–600 μm in diameter. When young, these structures are entirely covered by the thallus material up to their apex, though with age, erosion may expose a black tip. In cross-section, the perithecia measure 250–310 μm in diameter and are enclosed by a conical protective covering (involucrellum) that extends down to the substrate. This involucrellum contains dark brown pigment that turns dark grey when treated with potassium hydroxide solution (K+).

The spore-containing sacs (asci) within the perithecia produce single-celled (aseptate), colourless, ellipsoidal spores (ascospores) that typically measure 21.5–26.5 by 9–10.5 μm, though they can range from 19–30.5 by 8–12 μm. These spores are about 2.2–2.7 times as long as they are wide. Unlike some related species, mature spores of V. placida apparently lack an outer protective layer (perispore). No structures for producing asexual spores (conidiomata) have been documented in this species.

== See also ==
- List of Verrucaria species
