= Verrucaria aucklandica =

Scientific classification
- Kingdom: Fungi
- Division: Ascomycota
- Class: Eurotiomycetes
- Order: Verrucariales
- Family: Verrucariaceae
- Genus: Verrucaria
- Species: V. aucklandica

Binomial name
- Verrucaria aucklandica Zahlbr. (1941)

Synonyms
- Verrucaria tessellatuloidea P.M.McCarthy (1991)

Species of lichen

Verrucaria aucklandica is a species of saxicolous (rock-dwelling) crustose lichen in the family Verrucariaceae. It forms thin, greyish crusts that crack into small angular plates on coastal rocks exposed to salt spray. The species was first discovered at Anawhata Bay near Auckland in the early 20th century. Though originally thought to be endemic to New Zealand, it has since been found in Tasmania and Taiwan.

== Taxonomy ==
Verrucaria aucklandica was formally described as a new species in 1941 by the German lichenologist Alexander Zahlbruckner. The type was collected by the New Zealand botanist Lucy Cranwell. The taxon Verrucaria tessellatuloidea, described by Patrick McCarthy in 1991 from collections made in Cape Bruny, Tasmania, is now considered a synonym of V. adguttata.

== Description ==
The thallus is an epilithic (rock-dwelling) crust that adheres tightly to the substrate and is rather thin, measuring to about 0.35 mm thick. It is dull grey to grey-brown and chemically unreactive in the standard chemical spot tests (K−, C−). The surface is areolate (cracked into small, mostly angular plates); each areole is 1–1.5 mm across, separated by fine fissures and with a smooth, flat to slightly domed upper face. A narrow cortex overlies a homoiomerous interior (the algal cells are distributed through the thallus rather than in a distinct layer). The photobiont consists of bright-green, spherical "cystococcoid" cells (spherical green algal cells that are wrapped in a conspicuous gelatinous capsule), 10–15 micrometres (μm) in diameter, evenly spread through the thallus.

The fruiting bodies are immersed and appear at the surface only as tiny black pin-points. Zahlbruckner called them "apothecia" in the older sense; in modern terms they are perithecia: flask-shaped structures with a pore-like opening at the top. The perithecial wall is dark brown-black, roughly 30–35 μm thick at the sides and base, becoming thicker near the top to about 60 μm, and passing into a short straight neck. The interior tissues are colourless. Hair-fine periphyses line the pore; distinct paraphyses are absent. Asci are oval to club-shaped and eight-spored. The ascospores are colourless and simple (without internal septa), ellipsoid to oval, straight, thin-walled and with evenly oily contents, measuring about 10–11 μm × 6 μm. Each areole may contain one to several (up to nine) perithecia.

== Habitat and distribution ==
The species was described from coastal rock at Anawhata Bay, North Auckland (Auckland Region), New Zealand, where it forms a thin, adherent crust directly on the seaside rock. It has also been recorded from the Poor Knights Islands off the east coast of North Auckland, and well as western and southern Tasmania. Verrucaria aucklandica was recorded from Taiwan in 2003.

== See also ==
- List of Verrucaria species
