= Verrucaria nodosa =

Scientific classification
- Kingdom: Fungi
- Division: Ascomycota
- Class: Eurotiomycetes
- Order: Verrucariales
- Family: Verrucariaceae
- Genus: Verrucaria
- Species: V. nodosa

Binomial name
- Verrucaria nodosa Orange (2013)
- Holotype: Merioneth, Wales

Species of lichen

Verrucaria nodosa is a species of saxicolous (rock-dwelling), crustose lichen in the family Verrucariaceae. It is found in freshwater habitats in north Wales.

== Taxonomy ==
Verrucaria nodosa was formally described as a new species in 2013 by the lichenologist Alan Orange. The type specimen was collected by the author north-west of Llanuwchllyn, Merioneth, where it was found growing on an unshaded rock in a stream.

== Description ==
The thallus (the main body of the lichen) of Verrucaria nodosa appears superficial on its substrate, ranging in colour from grey-green (in shaded locations) to dark brown, and measuring 70–500 micrometres (μm) in thickness. The thallus initially develops as discrete, flattened units that become crowded and overlap as they grow, forming an uneven crust with occasional secondary cracks. In some cases, these units overlap significantly, creating a thick, uneven surface. The lichen's texture is distinctly uneven when viewed up close.

When examined in cross-section, the thallus is divided into units of varying size (30–325 μm thick) with a paraplectenchymatous structure (composed of cells arranged in a tissue-like pattern). The fungal cells are either round or slightly oblong, measuring about 5–9 by 4–8 μm. These cells can be tightly packed and polygonal in shape, or somewhat rounded with noticeable air spaces between them. The upper (and sometimes lower) surfaces of the thallus units display brown pigmentation in their cell walls. The photobiont (the algal partner in the lichen symbiosis) consists of cells measuring 5.5–9.0 by 4.0–6.5 μm.

The reproductive structures (perithecia) form low to moderately convex projections with a conical-hemispherical shape, measuring 220–460 μm in diameter. Sometimes only the lower 20–30% of the perithecium is embedded in the thallus, with the projecting portion either exposed or partially covered by thallus tissue toward the base. In some cases, the perithecia may be almost completely covered by thallus units. The opening (ostiole) through which spores are released is inconspicuous or appears as a pale dot 20–40 μm wide, either flat or slightly projecting.

The protective covering (involucrellum) closely follows the shape of the exciple (inner protective wall) at the top, usually broadening below to form a steep conical-hemispherical outline. It is densely pigmented throughout, though sometimes with a paler area near the base of the exciple. The pigmentation ranges from dark brown to dark reddish-brown, with the ostiolar area often displaying dark green pigment. The exciple measures 190–310 μm in diameter and is either colourless or has pigmentation in its outer layer. The periphyses (sterile filaments near the ostiole) measure approximately 25–40 μm long.

The ascospores (fungal spores) are colourless, ellipsoid, non-septate, and typically measure 20.5–22.2–24.0 by 9.0–9.7–10.5 μm, being 2–2.5 times as long as wide. Pycnidia (asexual reproductive structures) have not been observed in this species.

== Habitat and distribution ==
The species is known only from a few streams in Wales, where it grows on shaded or lightly shaded rocks. Associated lichen species include Ionaspis lacustris, Rhizocarpon lavatum, Porpidia hydrophila, Sporodictyon cruentum, and Trapelia coarctata, as well as the mosses Racomitrium aciculare and Scapania undulata.

== See also ==
- List of Verrucaria species
