= Verrucaria juglandis =

Scientific classification
- Kingdom: Fungi
- Division: Ascomycota
- Class: Eurotiomycetes
- Order: Verrucariales
- Family: Verrucariaceae
- Genus: Verrucaria
- Species: V. juglandis

Binomial name
- Verrucaria juglandis Gasparyan & Aptroot (2016)
- Holotype: Yeghegis, Armenia

Species of lichen

Verrucaria juglandis is a species of corticolous (bark-dwelling) crustose lichen in the family Verrucariaceae. It was described in 2016 from material collected on Persian walnut roots along a riverbank in Armenia, where it grows in a unique riparian habitat. The species is characterised by its narrow ascospores and distinctive half-cap covering over its fruiting bodies, distinguishing it from related rock-dwelling species.

== Taxonomy ==
Verrucaria juglandis was described as new to science in 2016 by Arsen Gasparyan and André Aptroot. The type was collected from the roots of Persian walnut (Juglans regia) on a river bank near Yeghegis, Shatin (Vayots Dzor, Armenia) at about 1,600 m elevation on 23 June 2015; the holotype is deposited in B. The species keys to the corticolous/lignicolous group of Verrucaria but differs from similar taxa by its narrow, 20–23 × 6–8 μm ascospores and a thin, dimidiate involucrellum (a dark cap covering only the upper half of each perithecium). It can be separated from rock-dwelling lookalikes such as V. riparia, V. aethiobola, and V. nigrescens by a combination of hamathecium iodine reactions, perithecium immersion, and consistently narrower spores.

== Description ==
The lichen forms a dull, dark-brown crust (crustose thallus) that breaks into small plates (areoles), usually less than 0.2 mm thick and occupying patches up to about 2 cm across. A thin, black, branching prothallus threads between the areoles. Vegetative propagules are absent. The fruiting bodies are abundant, small, half-globes (perithecia) that emerge slightly from the thallus and measure about 0.2–0.3 mm in diameter; each has a thin, black involucrellum that covers only the upper half of the perithecium, and a tiny, depressed pore (ostiole) at the top. Internal tissues show an iodine-positive (I+) red-brown reaction in the hamathecium (the gelatinous tissue between the spore sacs). Asci are clavate with eight colourless, narrowly ellipsoid ascospores per ascus, 20–23 × 6–8 μm, lacking a distinct outer sheath (perispore). No pycnidia were seen, and spot tests are negative (thallus K−, C−, UV−).

== Habitat and distribution ==
Verrucaria juglandis is corticolous: it grows on exposed roots of Juglans regia along the Yeghegis River in riparian forest in Armenia. The roots sit more than a metre above the usual waterline but likely receive splash during heavy rain, creating conditions that also favour many rock-dwelling lichens; at the type site V. juglandis occurs among typically saxicolous species such as Athallia holocarpa, Candelariella aurella, Circinaria calcarea, members of the Myriolecis dispersa group, and Protoparmeliopsis muralis. Within a genus dominated by rock-inhabiting species, bark- or wood-dwelling Verrucaria remain uncommon worldwide, and V. juglandis is so far known only from this Armenian riparian setting; additional collections reported are from the same locality.

== See also ==
- List of Verrucaria species
