= Verrucaria simplex =

Scientific classification
- Kingdom: Fungi
- Division: Ascomycota
- Class: Eurotiomycetes
- Order: Verrucariales
- Family: Verrucariaceae
- Genus: Verrucaria
- Species: V. simplex

Binomial name
- Verrucaria simplex P.M.McCarthy (1988)

Species of lichen

Verrucaria simplex is a species of saxicolous (rock-dwelling), crustose lichen in the family Verrucariaceae. Found in Europe and Asia, it was described as new to science in 1988 by lichenologist Patrick McCarthy. The type specimen was collected by Brian Coppins from Morpeth, Northumberland; there, it was found growing on a fragment of mortar-cement lying on the floor of a woodland. The lichen was later reported from the Czech Republic, and Korea.

== Description ==
The dark brown, crust-like thallus of Verrucaria simplex is epilithic, meaning it grows on the surface of its substrate. It is 50–90 μm thick and lacks a prothallus. When the lichen is wet, it becomes greenish, pulp-like and translucent, described as resembling "film-like crusts of green algae". The photobiont partner of the lichen is a green alga with more or less spherical cells that measure 4–8 μm in diameter. The fruiting structure of the lichen is in the form of perithecia, 0.10 to 0.13 mm in diameter, that are either partially immersed in the thallus surface, or on the surface of the thallus. The asci contains eight ascospores and have dimensions of 18–30 by 10–12 μm. Ascospores are simple (i.e. without any septa), hyaline, and ellipsoid, typically measuring about 8.5 by 4.5 μm.

== Habitat, distribution, and ecology ==
Verrucaria simplex has been identified as "strongly urban" in its habitat preferences, frequently colonising brick and mortar substrates in urban wasteland environments across Britain. Surveys in England, Scotland, and Wales documented this species as widespread on these substrates, particularly in recently disturbed sites. It typically occurs as small patches of tiny perithecia among larger and more conspicuous lichens, or may become dominant in conditions of low light. This pyrenocarp species shows a particular affinity for mortar-encrusted brick rubble in urban settings.

== See also ==
- List of Verrucaria species
