= Verrucaria bulgarica =

Scientific classification
- Kingdom: Fungi
- Division: Ascomycota
- Class: Eurotiomycetes
- Order: Verrucariales
- Family: Verrucariaceae
- Genus: Verrucaria
- Species: V. bulgarica

Binomial name
- Verrucaria bulgarica Szatala (1930)

Species of lichen-forming fungus

Verrucaria bulgarica is a species of crustose lichen in the family Verrucariaceae. It forms a very thin, brown crustose thallus on soft limestone rocks, breaking into small angular plates dotted with minute, low-domed fruiting bodies. Originally described in 1930 from the Rhodope Mountains of Bulgaria, the species is now known from a handful of widely scattered locations including Great Britain and the South Orkney Islands in the Southern Ocean. The lichen is considered rare and is distinguished by its reduced structure, simple ascospores, and preference for calcareous substrates in cool, humid conditions.

== Taxonomy ==
Verrucaria bulgarica was formally described in 1930 by the Hungarian lichenologist Ödön Szatala in his second contribution to the lichen funga of Bulgaria. He published the species in a survey of collections made during a 1929 expedition across the Rhodope Mountains, where it appeared among a small number of taxa he considered new to science. Szatala characterised V. bulgarica as a distinct crustose species with a thin, brown, rimose-areolate thallus, immersed to low-verrucose perithecia, and small, simple ascospores. He compared it only indirectly to other Verrucaria with minute, immersed ascomata, emphasising its reduced cortex, vertically arranged algal cells, and the small, granular, non-septate spores as features warranting recognition at species level.

The type locality is in the eastern Rhodopes, on the Cepelarska planina, where the species was collected on limestone along the road between Pasmakli and Rajkovo at roughly 1,000 m elevation.

== Description ==
Verrucaria bulgarica forms a very thin, brown, crustose thallus on soft calcareous rock. Szatala described the thallus as only about 0.015 mm thick, breaking into small angular areoles 0.15–0.3 mm wide whose smooth, plane surfaces fit closely together and lack a differentiated cortex; the algal cells occur in closely packed vertical series, are simple plectenchymatous coccoid cells 5–10 μm in diameter with thin walls, and sometimes show one or two septa. Later re-examination of Szatala's type material found the epilithic thallus to be thin but usually more than 100 μm and up to about 140 μm thick, with a dark brown pigmented upper layer and no black basal layer, and recorded areoles 180–350 μm wide, with fertile areoles tending to be slightly larger than sterile ones.

The minute perithecia are abundant and initially immersed in the thallus, later becoming visible as low, conical to hemispherical warts 0.1–0.15 mm wide, each with a broad, darkened apex where the ostiole opens. In the type material they are 100–170 μm in diameter, usually one per areole, and stand prominent or semi-immersed in the centre of the areole; the perithecial wall is thin and plectenchymatous, colourless to pale brown below but dark, sooty black in its upper part, and bears a 15–35 μm thick, hemispherical to conical involucrellum that is appressed to the exciple and reaches down to the base. The perithecial wall shows no reaction with potassium hydroxide (KOH) solution, while the globose "nucleus" (the upper part of the centrum) turns yellow-brown in iodine, and paraphyses are not developed.

The asci are ventricose-clavate, thin-walled, and were measured by Szatala as 25–35 μm long by 14–18 μm wide, each containing eight ascospores arranged in two rows; later authors did not observe intact asci in their sections of the type material, but reported the spores as simple, broadly ellipsoid, hyaline and lacking a distinct perispore, measuring 10–12 μm long by 7–8 μm wide. Szatala described the spores as granular, simple and ellipsoid to more or less spherical, 9–11 μm long by 4.5–7 μm wide, with thin walls.

== Habitat and distribution ==
Verrucaria bulgarica was originally collected in the eastern Rhodopes of southern Bulgaria. The type material comes from soft calcareous rock along the roadside between Pasmakli and Rajkovo, which Szatala treated as typical habitat for the species in that region. Later examination of the type locality noted that the substratum is friable and unstable, an unusual situation for crustose Verrucaria because of ongoing erosion, and suggested that thallus morphology may vary under different conditions. Subsequent work has shown that V. bulgarica is a terrestrial lichen growing over calcareous rocks, and it has now been reported from Bulgaria, Great Britain, and the South Orkney Islands in the Southern Ocean. British material has been recorded mainly on rock, with some collections on damp, shaded Ulmus bark, suggesting a degree of substrate flexibility within cool, humid microhabitats. In Bulgaria, however, the species remains known only from Szatala's original locality near Smolyan, and no further national records have been reported since the 1930s.

Because it is documented from only a few localities worldwide despite targeted study of pyrenocarpous lichens in Bulgaria and elsewhere, V. bulgarica is regarded as a rare species. Shivarov and Lőkös consider it ecologically and morphologically close to Verrucaria tristis, another small-spored, calcareous-dwelling species, but separate on the basis of its smaller perithecia and the structure of the involucrellum.

== See also ==
- List of Verrucaria species
