= Verrucaria hydrophila =

Scientific classification
- Domain: Eukaryota
- Kingdom: Fungi
- Division: Ascomycota
- Class: Eurotiomycetes
- Order: Verrucariales
- Family: Verrucariaceae
- Genus: Verrucaria
- Species: V. hydrophila

Binomial name
- Verrucaria hydrophila Orange (2013)

Species of lichen

Verrucaria hydrophila is a species of saxicolous (rock-dwelling), crustose lichen in the family Verrucariaceae. Found in freshwater habitats in Europe, it was formally described as a new species in 2013 by lichenologist Alan Orange. The type specimen was collected by the author from Melindwr, Coed y Fron Wyllt (Bontuchel, Wales), where it was found in a woodland growing on a shaded stone in a stream. The lichen has a thin, smooth, grey-green to brownish thallus that is somewhat translucent when wet. It is widespread in Europe and the British Isles, where it grows on rocks and stones in streams and seepages; the species epithet refers to its semi-aquatic habitat.

== Description ==
Verrucaria hydrophila is a crustose lichen that forms a thin thallus (main body) measuring 25–60 μm in thickness. The thallus appears smooth and is either continuous or has sparse cracks. Its colour ranges from grey-green to mid-brown, and when fresh and wet, it becomes somewhat translucent. Internally, the cells are arranged irregularly, showing at most a very weak vertical pattern. These cells are tightly packed together without air spaces between them. When present, the pigment in the cortical (outer) layer is brown. Characteristically, when multiple thalli of this species grow adjacent to each other, they are never separated by dark lines.

The reproductive structures, called perithecia, form conical-hemispherical mounds that measure 240–400 μm in width. Initially, these are completely covered by a layer of thallus all the way to their apex (top). As they mature, the black apex of the involucrellum (protective covering around the perithecium) may become exposed. In a 25 mm^{2} area, one typically finds between 29 and 64 perithecia, with an average of 42. The ostiolar area (opening through which spores are released) is inconspicuous, either flat or convex, appearing as a pale dot measuring 15–50 μm in width.

The involucrellum is conical in shape and extends to the substrate. It is densely pigmented on its upper side, but often becomes almost colourless near the base of the exciple (inner wall of the fruiting body). The pigment colour ranges from dark brown to dark reddish-brown, turning darker brown to grey-brown when treated with potassium hydroxide solution (K+). The exciple measures 145–225 μm in diameter and is colourless except at its apex. The ascospores typically measure 19.5–21.1–23.0 by 8.0–8.9–9.5 μm. No perispore (outer spore layer) was detected in this species. Pycnidia (asexual reproductive structures) were not observed in this lichen.

== See also ==
- List of Verrucaria species
