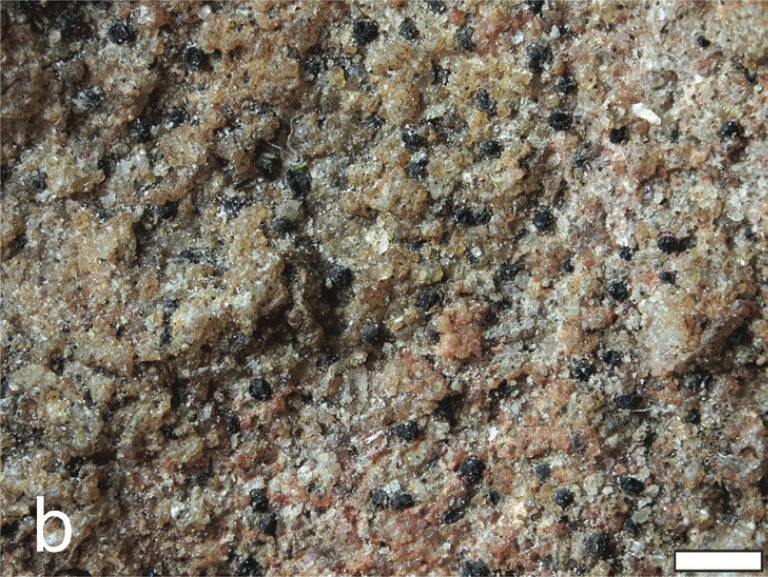
- Image of holotype specimen; scale bar = 1 mm

Scientific classification
- Kingdom: Fungi
- Division: Ascomycota
- Class: Eurotiomycetes
- Order: Verrucariales
- Family: Verrucariaceae
- Genus: Verrucaria
- Species: V. cavernarum

Binomial name
- Verrucaria cavernarum Pykälä & Myllys (2020)
- Holotype: Oulanka National Park, Finland

= Verrucaria cavernarum =

Species of lichen

Verrucaria cavernarum is a species of saxicolous (rock-dwelling) crustose lichen in the family Verrucariaceae. It is found in Finland.

== Taxonomy ==
Verrucaria cavernarum was described as new to science in 2020 by the Finnish lichenologists Juha Pykälä, Annina Kantelinen and Leena Myllys. It is part of the "Verrucaria subtilis complex", a group of closely related species within the genus Verrucaria. This complex is characterised by large spores, perithecia (fruiting bodies) that leave pits in the rock substrate, and a pale, thin thallus (lichen body). While morphologically similar to other members of this complex, particularly V. subtilis, V. cavernarum can be distinguished through DNA analysis of the internal transcribed spacer region, showing a genetic divergence of 2.8–3.4% from V. subtilis.

== Description ==
The thallus of Verrucaria cavernarum forms a thin, grey to pale greyish-brown crust on calcareous rock surfaces. It can be endolithic (growing within the rock) or thinly epilithic (growing on the surface), and is often continuous rather than fragmented.

The perithecia are small (0.15–0.28 mm in diameter) and mostly immersed in the rock substrate, leaving shallow to deep pits when they decay. This pit-forming characteristic is reflected in the species' name, with cavernarum referring to the cave-like depressions left in the rock.

A key feature of V. cavernarum is its involucrellum, an outer layer covering the perithecium. This structure typically covers the top half of the perithecium but can occasionally extend further.

The spores of V. cavernarum are relatively large, measuring 23–34 μm long and 10–14 μm wide. They are typically non-septate (lacking internal divisions), though rarely, spores with a single septum may be observed.

== Habitat and distribution ==
Verrucaria cavernarum grows on calcareous rocks, including dolomite. It has been found in a variety of habitats, including river shores (where it may be periodically submerged), seashores, and limestone quarries. This suggests the species may prefer more humid environments compared to its close relatives.

The known distribution of V. cavernarum in Finland is limited, with specimens recorded from both southwestern Finland and northeastern Finland (in the Oulanka area). This disjunct distribution pattern suggests the species may be more widespread but overlooked or misidentified in intervening areas.

== See also ==
- List of Verrucaria species
