= Heinrich Christian Funck =

German botanist (1771–1839)

Heinrich Christian Funck (22 November 1771 – 14 April 1839) was a German pharmacist and bryologist. He was a co-founder of the Regensburg Botanical Society.

Funck was born in Wunsiedel, Bavaria. He received early training at a pharmacy in Regensburg, subsequently studying in Salzburg, Erlangen and Jena. In 1803 he acquired the family-owned pharmacy in Gefrees, from where he performed research of cryptogams, especially bryophytes. He conducted botanical investigations in the nearby Fichtel Mountains, and also organized excursions to the Salzburg Alps, Italy, Switzerland, et al. Funck edited several series of exsiccatae and distributed the sets of specimens in bounded volumes. In 1800 he started the first of them with the title Cryptogamische Gewächse des Fichtelgebirg's.

In 1834 he sold the pharmacy in Gefrees in order to devote more time and energy to botany. Funck died of a stroke in Gefrees on 14 April 1839.

== Written works ==
- Kryptogamische Gewächse des Fichtelgebirges, Leipzig; exsiccata work, second edition 1806–1838, 42 fascicles) – Cryptogamic plants of the Fichtelgebirge.
- Deutschlands Moose: Ein Taschenherbarium zum Gebrauch auf botanischen Excursionen, Bayreuth (1820) – Mosses of Germany : a pocket herbarium for use on botanical excursions.
