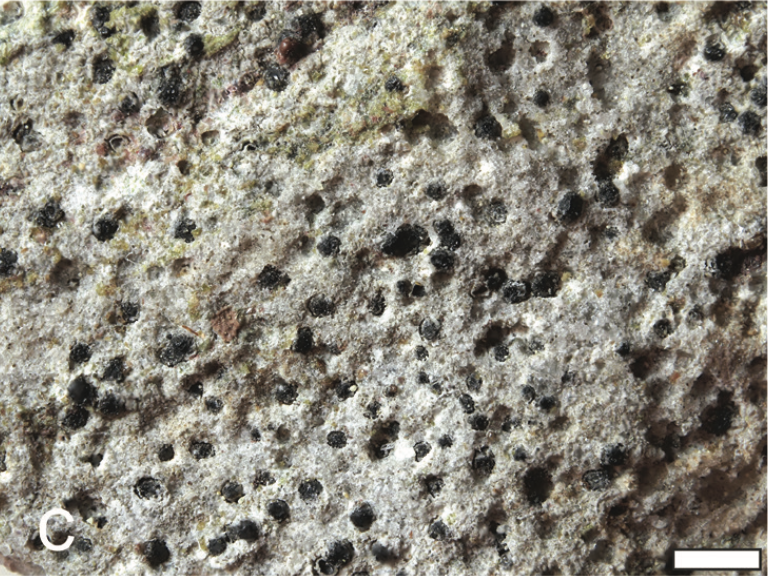
- Image of holotype specimen; scale bar = 1 mm

Scientific classification
- Kingdom: Fungi
- Division: Ascomycota
- Class: Eurotiomycetes
- Order: Verrucariales
- Family: Verrucariaceae
- Genus: Verrucaria
- Species: V. difficilis

Binomial name
- Verrucaria difficilis Pykälä & Myllys (2020)
- Holotype: Varsinais-Suomi, Finland

= Verrucaria difficilis =

Species of lichen

Verrucaria difficilis is a species of saxicolous (rock-dwelling) crustose lichen in the family Verrucariaceae. It is found in Finland.

== Taxonomy ==
Verrucaria difficilis was described as new to science in 2020 by the Finnish lichenologists Juha Pykälä, Annina Kantelinen and Leena Myllys. It belongs to the "Verrucaria subtilis complex", a group of closely related species within the genus Verrucaria. This complex is characterised by large spores, perithecia (fruiting bodies) that leave pits in the rock substrate, and a pale, thin thallus (lichen body). The species epithet difficilis, meaning difficult in Latin, alludes to the challenges in distinguishing this species from its close relatives based on morphology alone. Despite its morphological similarities to other members of the complex, V. difficilis can be identified through DNA analysis of the internal transcribed spacer region, showing a genetic divergence of 1.7–2.6% from its closest relatives.

== Description ==
Verrucaria difficilis forms an inconspicuous, white or grey crust (thallus) on calcareous rock surfaces. The thallus can be endolithic (growing within the rock) or thinly epilithic (growing on the surface), and is often continuous or irregularly cracked.

The perithecia are small to medium-sized (0.18–0.36 mm in diameter) and partially immersed in the rock substrate, typically leaving shallow pits. A distinguishing feature of V. difficilis is its involucrellum, an outer layer covering the perithecium, which often extends to cover half or more of the perithecium's height.

The spores of V. difficilis are relatively large, measuring 23–34 μm long and 10–13 μm wide. They are non-septate (lacking internal divisions) and enclosed in a thin perispore.

== Habitat and distribution ==
Verrucaria difficilis grows on calcareous rocks, including in limestone quarries. It has been found on various substrates within these habitats, including rock walls, boulders, stones, and pebbles. The species may have a preference for partially shaded environments, though more ecological research is needed to confirm this.

The known distribution of V. difficilis in Finland is limited and disjunct, with specimens recorded from both southwestern Finland and northeastern Finland. Only four sequenced specimens have been identified, suggesting that the species may be rare or possibly overlooked due to its morphological similarity to other Verrucaria species. Two specimens were found in southwestern Finland and two in northeastern Finland, in the Oulanka area known for its dolomite formations.

The scattered distribution pattern and limited number of confirmed specimens make V. difficilis a species of interest for further research into its ecology and distribution. Its presence in both southern and northern Finland suggests it may be more widespread but potentially under-recorded due to identification challenges.

== See also ==
- List of Verrucaria species
