= Koillismaa =

Coordinates: 65.9643°N 29.1884°E

Koillismaa Koillismaan seutukunta
- Sub-region
- Country: Finland
- Region: North Ostrobothnia
- Capital: Kuusamo

Population (2011)
  - Total: 20,843
- Time zone: UTC+2 (EET)
  - Summer (DST): UTC+3 (EEST)

Koillismaa (lit. 'Northeast Land') is a subdivision of North Ostrobothnia and one of the sub-regions of Finland since 2009.

== Municipalities ==
Coat of arms	Municipality
Kuusamon vaakuna	Kuusamo (city)
Taivalkosken vaakuna	Taivalkoski (municipality)

== Geographic region ==
Koillismaa is also a geographic region, which includes Kuusamo, Taivalkoski, Posio and Pudasjärvi, sometimes also Ranua and Ylikiiminki (which was merged into Oulu in 2009). The name was first used by Reino Rinne, the founder of the newspaper Koillissanomat in 1950, however the name was popularized by Kalle Päätalo in the 1960s.

=== Dialects ===
The dialects of Kuusamo, Taivalkoski and Posio are Savonian dialects, specifically Kainuu dialects. Parts of Pudasjärvi also use a Kainuu dialect.

== See also ==
- Kainuu
- Lapland (Finland)
