= Halospora =

Scientific classification
- Domain: Eukaryota
- Kingdom: Fungi
- Division: Ascomycota
- Class: Eurotiomycetes
- Order: Verrucariales
- Family: Verrucariaceae
- Genus: Halospora (Zschacke) Tomas. & Cif. (1952)

Type species
- Halospora deminuta (Arnold) Tomas. & Cif. (1952)

Species
- H. deminuta H. discrepans H. scammoeca

Synonyms
- Polyblastia subgen. Halospora Zschacke (1914)

Genus of fungi

Halospora is a genus of lichenicolous (lichen-dwelling) fungi in the family Verrucariaceae. Species in the genus parasitise calcicolous crustose lichens, i.e., those that prefer lime-rich substrates.

== Taxonomy ==
The grouping was first proposed in 1914 by German lichenologist Georg Hermann Zschacke as a subgenus of Polyblastia. Ruggero Tomaselli and Raffaele Ciferri promoted it to generic status in 1952, with Halospora deminuta as the type species. In 2002, Roux and colleagues proposed to place Halospora deminuta in the genus Merismatium. In 2011, Josef Hafellner resurrected the genus Halospora for use with former Merismatium and Polyblastia species with thick-walled ascospores and a distinct perispore (a colorless, often gelatinous layer enveloping a spore) somewhat resembling a "halo". The genus name refers to this characteristic feature. Hafellner retained species with thin-walled, non-halonate ascospores in Merismatium.

== Description ==
Halospora fungi are immersed in the thallus of their host and are not externally visible. For this reason they are often unnoticed, even when the host lichen is examined or collected by experts. The fungi produce immersed to partially immersed, black perithecioid ascomata that are 150–300 μm wide. Their asci contains eight spores, are more or less cylindrical to slightly club-shaped (clavate), and measure 50–95 by 15–35 μm. Ascospores start out somewhat brown and darken in maturity; they are roughly spherical to ellipsoid in shape, with 1 to 7 transverse septa and 0 to 2 longitudinal septa that divide the spore into internal cells, typically numbering between 4 and 12. The spores, which have dimensions of 11–35 by 7–17 μm, have thick walls, and a distinct perispore that resembles a halo when viewed microscropically.

== Species ==
- Halospora deminuta (Arnold) Tomas. & Cif. (1952) – hosts: Thelidium, Polyblastia, other endolithic lichens
- Halospora discrepans (J.Lahm ex Arnold) Hafellner (2011) – hosts: primarily Protoblastenia; also Aspicilia, Hymenelia, Verrucaria
- Halospora scammoeca (Lettau) Hafellner (2011) – hosts: Polyblastia, Thelidium, Verrucaria

The nomenclatural authority Index Fungorum accepts Merismatium deminutum as the preferred synonym for Halospora deminuta, while it considers Halospora longispora (Cl.Roux & Nav.-Ros.) Hafellner (2011) to be a synonym of M. deminutum.
