= Sarcopyrenia =

Scientific classification
- Kingdom: Fungi
- Division: Ascomycota
- Class: Eurotiomycetes
- Order: Verrucariales
- Family: Sarcopyreniaceae; Nav.-Ros. & Cl.Roux (1998)
- Genus: Sarcopyrenia; Nyl. (1858)

Type species
- Sarcopyrenia gibba Nyl. (1856)

Species
- See text

Synonyms
- Hassea Zahlbr. (1902); Sarcopyreniomyces Cif. & Tomas. (1953); Sarcopyreniopsis Cif. & Tomas. (1953)

Genus of fungi

Sarcopyrenia is a genus of lichenicolous (lichen-dwelling) fungi. It has 11 species. It is the only genus in Sarcopyreniaceae, a family in the order Verrucariales. Sarcopyreniaceae is one of the few families composed entirely of lichenicolous fungi. These tiny fungi produce small, black, flask-shaped fruiting bodies (perithecia) typically less than half a millimetre across, containing extremely narrow, thread-like ascospores. While they initially grow on crustose lichens, their fruiting bodies often outlast their hosts and end up sitting on bare rock, making their exact relationship with lichens somewhat unclear.

== Taxonomy ==
Sarcopyrenia was circumscribed by Finnish lichenologist William Nylander in 1858, with Sarcopyrenia gibba assigned as the type species. Nylander's Latin diagnosis emphasised the genus's barely visible thallus, prominent apothecia enclosed in a thick outer structure (conceptacle), and a distinctive double-layered opening. He characterised the ascospores as colourless and cylindrical, and noted the absence of paraphyses. The type species was described from calcareous rocks in Algeria, with black, hemispherical fruiting bodies about 0.5 mm across.

== Description ==
In species of Sarcopyrenia the lichen body (thallus), when it is developed at all, is an ill-defined film that is olive-grey and either scaly or made of tiny granules. It partners with a green alga (the photobiont) and often seems to form as the host lichen beneath it breaks down; a separate border (prothallus) is seldom seen, but when present it is white to pale grey.

The sexual fruiting bodies are perithecia: small, black, flask-like structures with a single pore (an ostiole) at the top. They are carbon-rich and brittle, smooth to slightly warty, and tend to occur singly rather than in clusters. Young perithecia can begin partly buried in the thallus, but as the surrounding tissue deteriorates they end up sitting on the surface. The wall of the perithecium (the exciple) is built in three layers of angular cells: an outer, coal-black carbonised layer; a middle layer that ranges from colourless to darkened; and a thinner inner layer of smaller, side-compressed cells.

Inside the perithecium the spore-bearing tissue includes fine threads (paraphyses) that disappear early, while short bristles lining the pore (periphyses) are present. The gel around the spores does not change colour in iodine tests, and the spore sacs (asci) are cylindrical to slightly club-shaped, short-stalked, thin-walled, and do not show the special "double-wall" opening (fissitunicate) or beaked tip (rostrate) seen in some other ascomycetes. Each ascus carries eight colourless spores arranged in two rows. The spores are thin-walled and very narrow—ranging from thread-like to dumb-bell-shaped, sometimes gently S-shaped—with slightly swollen tips; they may be one-celled or with a cross-wall, and lack any gelatinous sheath or appendages. Asexual reproductive structures (conidiomata) have not been observed, and standard thin-layer chromatography has not detected secondary lichen substances.

Sarcopyrenia species are usually treated as lichen-dwelling fungi (lichenicolous), although some authors have reported an associated simple green alga (a chlorococcoid photobiont). Colonies appear to begin as parasites of crustose lichens, but the fruiting bodies often outlast the host and end up on bare rock, leaving their mode of nutrition uncertain.

== Species ==
Host data is from Diederich, Lawrey, and Ertz's 2018 review of lichenicolous fungi.

- Sarcopyrenia acutispora Nav.-Ros. & Cl.Roux (1998) – on Bagliettoa calciseda
- Sarcopyrenia bacillosa (Nyl.) Nav.-Ros. & Hladun (2004) – on saxicolous lichens
- Sarcopyrenia bacillospora Nav.-Ros. & Hladun (1990) – on Thelidium and Verrucaria
- Sarcopyrenia baetica Nav.-Ros. & Hladun (2009) – on Lecania cf. erysibe
- Sarcopyrenia beckhausiana (J.Lahm) M.B.Aguirre, Nav.-Ros. & Hladun (1990) – on saxicolous lichens (mostly from family Verrucariaceae)
- Sarcopyrenia calcarea Lendemer & R.C.Harris (2013)
- Sarcopyrenia cylindrospora (P.Crouan & H.Crouan) M.B.Aguirre (1990) – mostly on Aspicilia
- Sarcopyrenia gibba (Nyl.) Nyl. (1858) – on saxicolous lichens
- Sarcopyrenia lichinellae Nav.-Ros. & Hladun (2009) – on Lichinella stipatula
- Sarcopyrenia pluriseptata Nav.-Ros. & Cl.Roux (2009) – on Pyrenodesmia variabilis
- Sarcopyrenia sigmoideospora Tretiach & Nav.-Ros. (1996) – on Bagliettoa
