= Adelococcus alpestris =

Scientific classification
- Domain: Eukaryota
- Kingdom: Fungi
- Division: Ascomycota
- Class: Eurotiomycetes
- Order: Verrucariales
- Family: Adelococcaceae
- Genus: Adelococcus
- Species: A. alpestris

Binomial name
- Adelococcus alpestris (Zopf) Theiss. & Syd.

Species of fungus

Adelococcus alpestris is a species of fungus belonging to the family Adelococcaceae.

It is native to Europe and Northern America.
