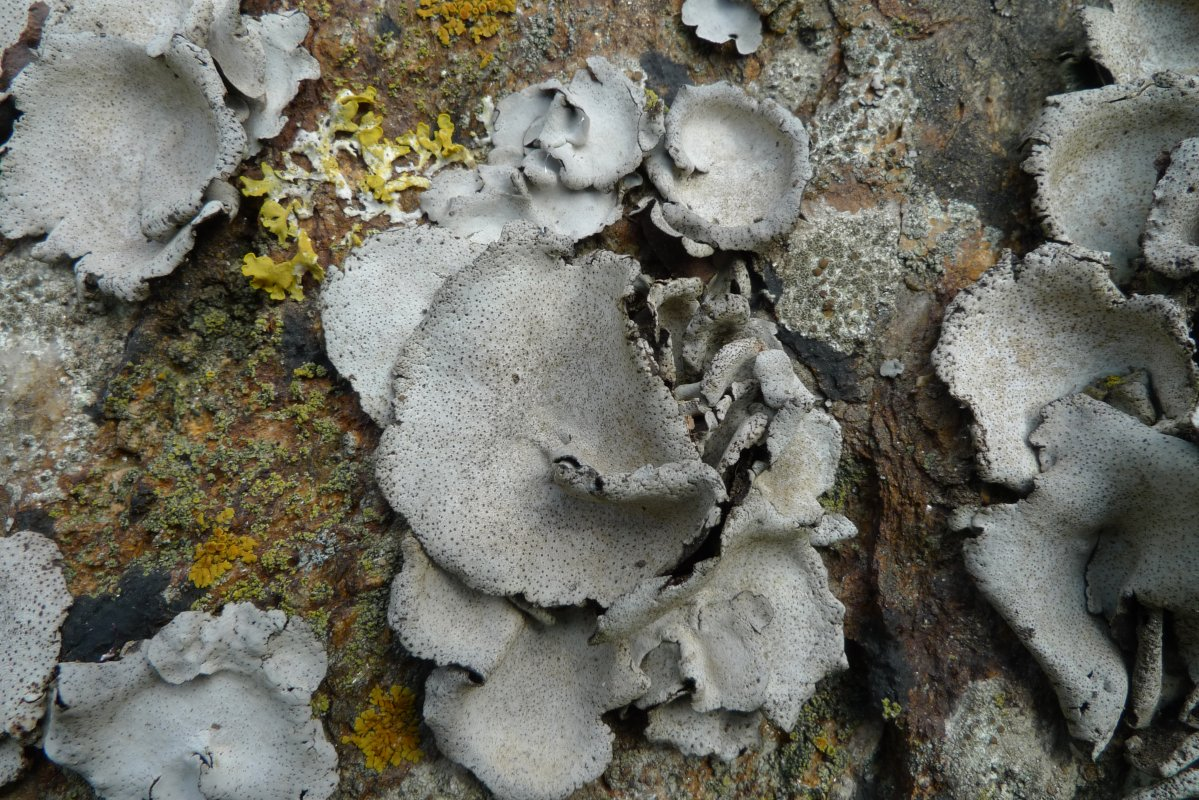
- Dermatocarpon miniatum

Scientific classification
- Kingdom: Fungi
- Division: Ascomycota
- Class: Eurotiomycetes
- Order: Verrucariales
- Family: Verrucariaceae
- Genus: Dermatocarpon; Eschw. (1824)

Type species
- Dermatocarpon miniatum (L.) W.Mann (1825)

Synonyms
- Capnia Vent. (1799); Endocarpomyces E.A.Thomas ex Cif. & Tomas. (1953); Endocarpon subdiv. Entosthelia Wallr. (1831); Entosthelia (Wallr.) Hue (1915); Epistictum Trevis. (1869)

= Dermatocarpon =

Genus of lichen

Dermatocarpon is a genus of lichens in the family Verrucariaceae. Members of the genus are commonly called stippleback lichens because they have fruiting structures called perithecia that are flask-shaped structures embedded in the nonfruiting body (thallus), with a hole in the top to release spores, causing an appearance of being covered with small black dots. Its species are told apart chiefly by spore size, the colour and texture of the lower surface, and whether the epinecral layer gives a pruinose bloom.

== Description ==
Dermatocarpon lichens form grey-brown sheets that range from minute overlapping scales (squamules) to broad, leaf-like lobes (foliose thalli). Each thallus is anchored by one or several stout holdfasts that act like suction pads; the lower surface otherwise lacks the root-like rhizines common in many rock-dwelling lichens, although a few species develop wart-like or hair-like nodules that can be mistaken for rhizines. Both upper and lower faces possess a true cortex—a layer of tightly packed fungal cells. On the upper side these cells are arranged in a pseudoparenchymatous tissue and often contain brown pigment near the surface. An overlying film of dead, compressed cells (the epinecral layer) is usually thin; when its cells collapse and trap air the surface appears dusted with a pale bloom (pruina), but in many species the layer remains compact and the thallus looks plain. Beneath the cortex lies a loose medulla of filamentous hyphae. The lower cortex mirrors the upper one in construction but its outermost cells are smaller, thicker-walled and usually pigmented brown.

The photosynthetic partner is almost always the from the green algal genus Diplosphaera (class Trebouxiophyceae), specifically D. chodatii in most studied material; rarer reports of Myrmecia biatorellae and Protococcus dermatocarponis suggest some flexibility. Algal cells occupy a distinct band just under the upper cortex, leaving the medulla fungus-only. Sexual reproduction takes place in flask-shaped fruiting bodies (perithecioid ascomata) that are sunk into the thallus surface so that only their tiny pores are visible. Each perithecium lacks the dark protective cap (involucrellum) seen in many relatives; its wall is colourless except for a ring of pigment around the pore. Short sterile threads (periphyses and periphysoids) line the neck canal, but the longer filaments (paraphyses) found in many lichens are absent. The jelly that embeds the spore sacs stains weakly with iodine: it turns red in standard strength and blue when highly diluted, a behaviour known as hemiamyloidy.

Each club-shaped ascus contains eight smooth, colourless ascospores that are single-celled and ellipsoidal; they lie irregularly rather than in neat rows. Asexual reproduction is handled by immersed pycnidia scattered across the surface; these produce rod-shaped conidia. Chemical spot tests and thin-layer chromatography have failed to detect acetone-soluble secondary metabolites, though some species show a distinctive iodine-positive (red) reaction in the hyphal walls, indicating a polysaccharide rather than an aromatic lichen product.

== Ecology ==
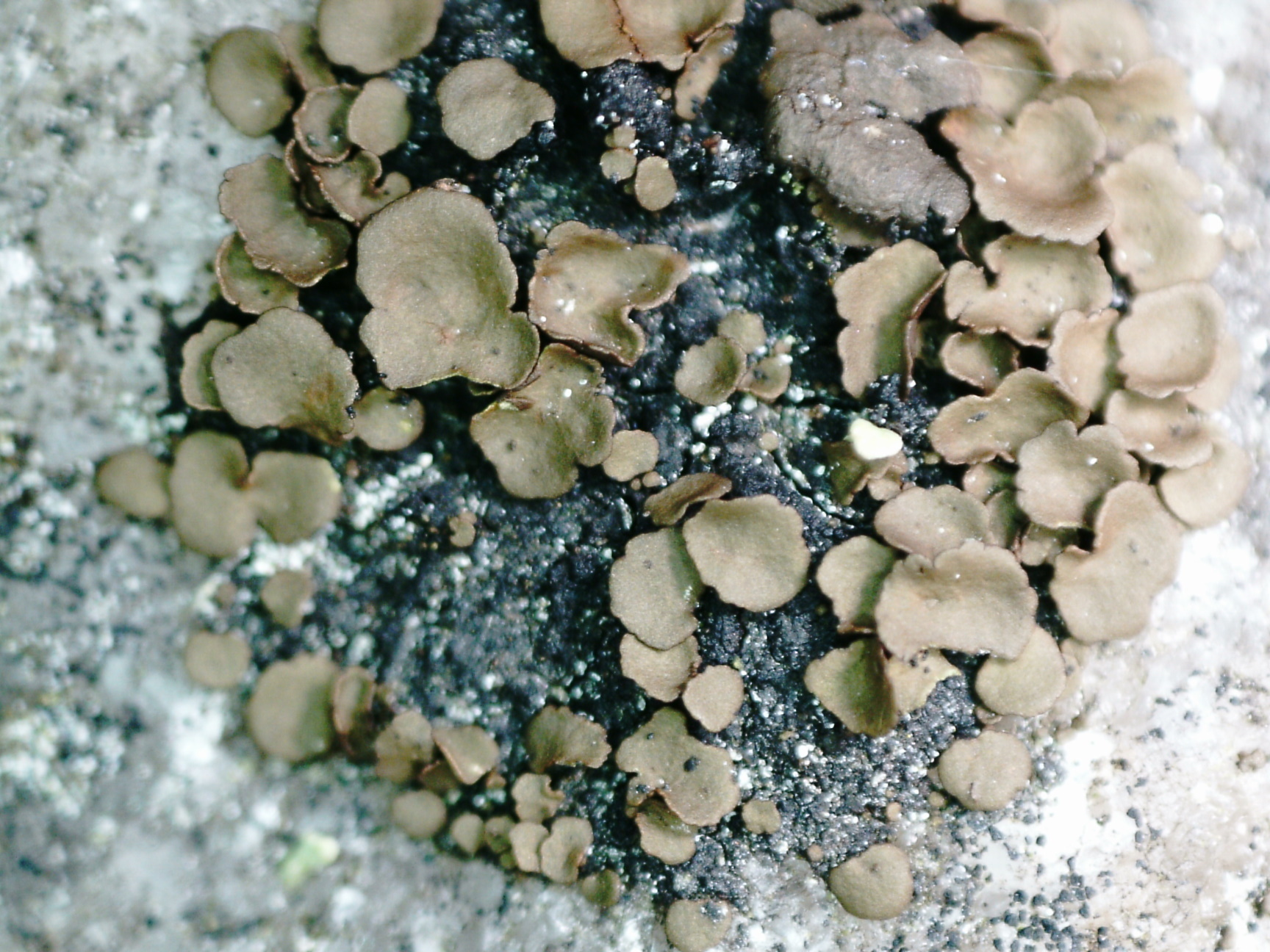
Dermatocarpon luridum

Dermatocarpon typically colonises siliceous or calcareous rock in moist settings—river margins, seepage faces and shaded cliffs. Dermatocarpon thalli function as small habitats for a diverse fungal community (mycobiome) that includes lichenicolous fungi living on or in the thallus and asymptomatic, endolichenic fungi with no visible symptoms. A metabarcoding study of D. miniatum found its associated mycobiome dominated by Ascomycota; at class level, Eurotiomycetes were most abundant in the Dermatocarpon samples. Basidiomycete reads were also detected and are interpreted mainly as asymptomatic yeasts residing in the cortex.

Across seven sampling campaigns spanning six spring weeks, there was no directional change in the Dermatocarpon-associated mycobiome; any short-term differences were small and likely random. Within D. miniatum, the lichen's own mycobiont (a biotrophic mutualist) made up the largest share of reads, while parasitic fungi were rare in the asymptomatic material sampled. The authors suggest that rock-dwelling lichens can act as "propagule banks", temporarily harbouring spores, propagules and immature mycelia until conditions favour establishment elsewhere. Chemistry may influence which fungi persist: no secondary metabolites are currently confirmed from Dermatocarpon spp., and, in general, lichen products can either deter or facilitate colonisation by associated fungi.

== Species ==
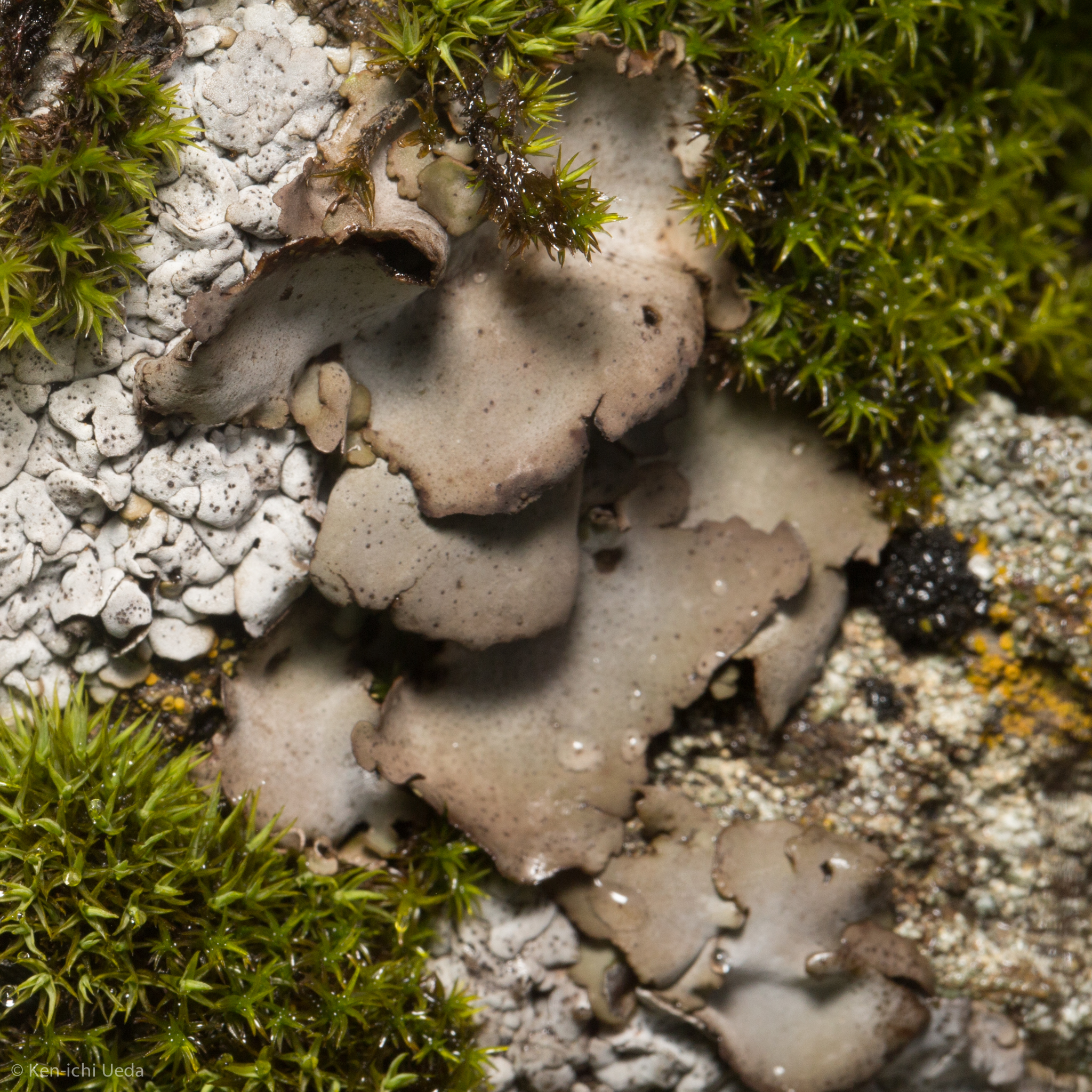
Dermatocarpon americanum

- Dermatocarpon americanum Vain. (1926)
- Dermatocarpon arenosaxi Amtoft (2008) – United States
- Dermatocarpon arnoldianum Degel. (1934)
- Dermatocarpon atrogranulosum Breuss (2003) – Canada
- Dermatocarpon bachmannii Anders (1922)
- Dermatocarpon deminuens Vain. (1921)
- Dermatocarpon dolomiticum Amtoft (2008) – United States
- Dermatocarpon intestiniforme (Körb.) Hasse (1912)
- Dermatocarpon leptophyllodes (Nyl.) Zahlbr. (1922)
- Dermatocarpon leptophyllum (Ach.) K.G.W.Lång (1921)
- Dermatocarpon linkolae Räsänen (1934)
- Dermatocarpon lorenzianum Anders (1922)
- Dermatocarpon luridum (Dill. ex With.) J.R.Laundon (1984)
- Dermatocarpon meiophyllizum Vain. (1921)
- Dermatocarpon moulinsii (Mont.) Zahlbr. (1903)
- Dermatocarpon miniatum (L.) W.Mann (1825)
- Dermatocarpon muhlenbergii (Ach.) Müll.Arg. (1885)
- Dermatocarpon multifolium Amtoft (2008) – United States
- Dermatocarpon polyphyllizum (Nyl.) Blomb. & Forssell (1880)
- Dermatocarpon reticulatum H.Magn. (1932)
- Dermatocarpon rivulorum (Arnold) Dalla Torre & Sarnth. (1902)
- Dermatocarpon schaechtelinii Werner (1934)
- Dermatocarpon taminium Heiðm. (2003)
- Dermatocarpon tenue (Müll.Arg.) Heiðm. (2003)
- Dermatocarpon tomentulosum Amtoft (2006) – USA; Bahamas
- Dermatocarpon vellereum Zschacke (1934)
