= Merismatium =

Scientific classification
- Kingdom: Fungi
- Division: Ascomycota
- Class: Eurotiomycetes
- Order: Verrucariales
- Genus: Merismatium; Zopf (1898)

Type species
- Merismatium lopadii (Anzi) Zopf (1898)

Species
- M. coccotremicola M. corae M. deminutum M. nigritellum M. peregrinum M. thamnoliicola

Genus of fungi

Merismatium is a genus of lichenicolous (lichen-dwelling) fungi of uncertain familial placement in the order Verrucariales. The genus was circumscribed in 1898 by Friedrich Wilhelm Zopf.

== Species ==
As of October 2022, Species Fungorum (in the Catalogue of Life) accepts six species of Merismatium. Host information is from Diederich et al. (2018).

- Merismatium coccotremicola Etayo (2008) – host: Coccotrema
- Merismatium corae (Pat.) Etayo & R.Sant. (2010) – host: Cora
- Merismatium deminutum (Arnold) Cl.Roux & Nav.-Ros. (2002) – hosts: Polyblastia, Staurothele, Thelidium, Verrucaria
- Merismatium nigritellum (Nyl.) Vouaux (1913) – hosts: Catapyrenium, Leptogium, Lichenomphalia, Lopadium, Micarea, Mycobilimbia, Ochrolechia, Protoblastenia
- Merismatium peregrinum (Flot.) Triebel (1990) – host: Rimularia
- Merismatium thamnoliicola Alstrup & E.S.Hansen (2001) – host: Thamnolia
