= Verrucaria serpuloides =

Scientific classification
- Domain: Eukaryota
- Kingdom: Fungi
- Division: Ascomycota
- Class: Eurotiomycetes
- Order: Verrucariales
- Family: Verrucariaceae
- Genus: Verrucaria
- Species: V. serpuloides

Binomial name
- Verrucaria serpuloides I.M.Lamb (1948)

Species of lichen found in Antarctica

Verrucaria serpuloides is a species of saxicolous (rock-dwelling), crustose lichen belonging to the family Verrucariaceae. It is native to the Antarctic Peninsula. It is one of only two permanently submerged species of lichen, the other being Hydrothyria venosa, and the only one found permanently submerged in a marine environment. Collections of the species were first made in 1944 by Elke Mackenzie.

The species has been discovered living up to 10 m (33 ft) below mean high tide. It creates jet-black patches on the base of submerged rocks. It uses green algae as a symbiont.

== See also ==
- List of Verrucaria species
