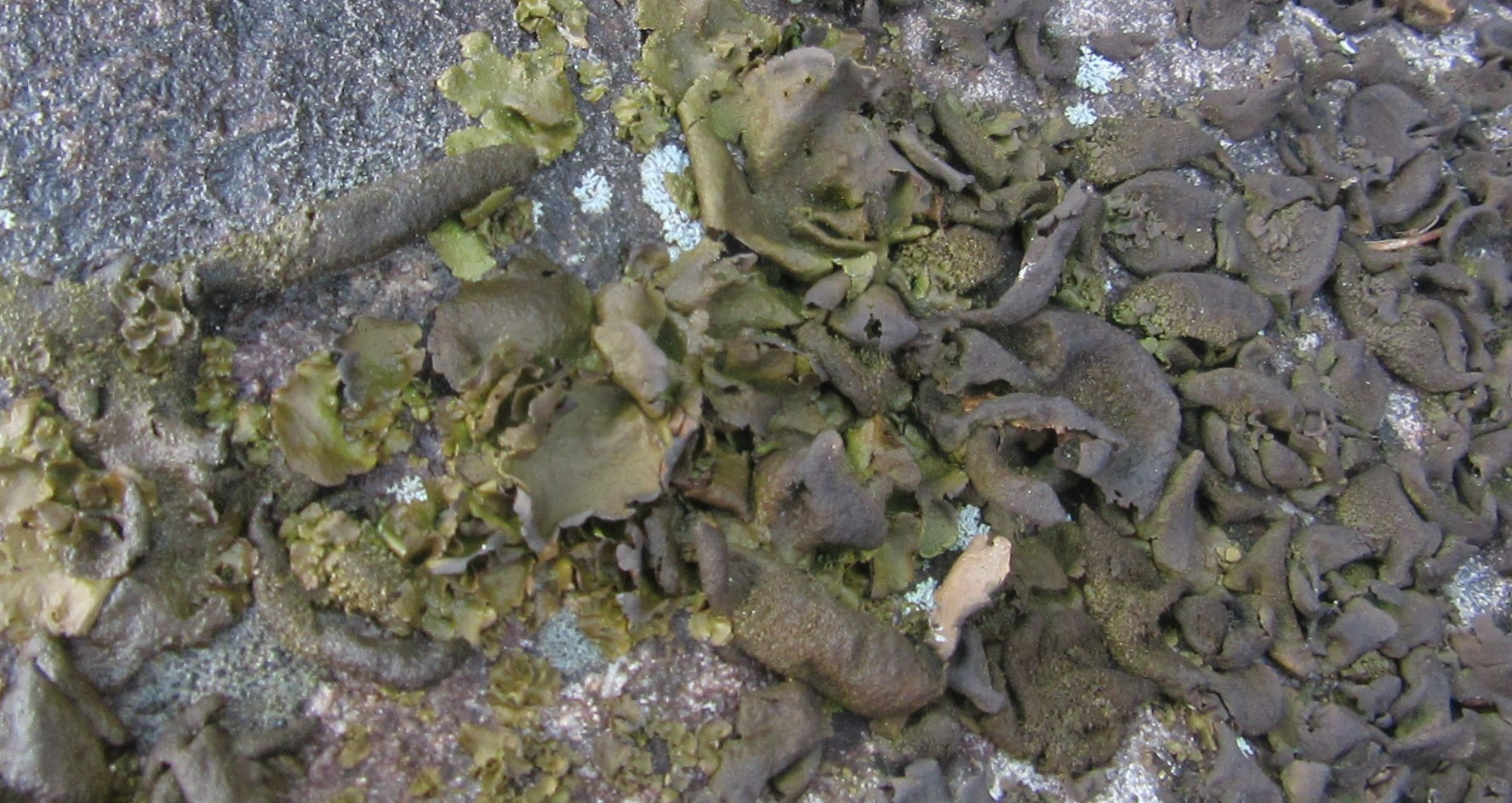

Conservation status
- Secure (NatureServe)

Scientific classification
- Domain: Eukaryota
- Kingdom: Fungi
- Division: Ascomycota
- Class: Eurotiomycetes
- Order: Verrucariales
- Family: Verrucariaceae
- Genus: Dermatocarpon
- Species: D. luridum

Binomial name
- Dermatocarpon luridum (Dill. ex With.) J.R.Laundon (1984)

Synonyms
- Lichen luridus Dill. ex With. (1776); Dermatocarpon aquaticum (Hoffm.) Zahlbr. (1901)

= Dermatocarpon luridum =

Species of lichen

Dermatocarpon luridum is a species of lichen belonging to the family Verrucariaceae.
