= Botryolepraria neotropica =

Scientific classification
- Kingdom: Fungi
- Division: Ascomycota
- Class: Eurotiomycetes
- Order: Verrucariales
- Genus: Botryolepraria
- Species: B. neotropica

Binomial name
- Botryolepraria neotropica Kukwa & Pérez-Ort. (2010)

Species of lichen-forming fungus

Botryolepraria neotropica is a species of saxicolous (rock-dwelling), byssoid (cottony) lichen in the order Verrucariales. It was formally described as a new species in 2010 from the Neotropics, and is known from shaded, damp places where it grows on sheltered rock surfaces, sometimes among liverworts. Under low magnification its pale, uncorticated thallus can resemble a granular Lepraria-like crust, but it differs from its relative B. lesdainii in having larger granules and in producing zeorin without lesdainin.

== Taxonomy ==
Botryolepraria neotropica was described in 2010 by Martin Kukwa and Sergio Pérez-Ortega. The type specimen was collected growing with liverworts on shaded vertical walls in El Yunque (Guantánamo province, Cuba), and the specific epithet refers to the species' Neotropical distribution. The species has also been reported from Bolivia and Peru.It is the second described member of Botryolepraria, a genus circumscribed in 1997.

A 2025 molecular study examined North American material identified as Botryolepraria sp. from a cypress swamp in Florida; in analyses of fungal ITS and LSU sequences, the Floridian samples formed a supported clade that was sister to published sequences of B. neotropica. In the same analyses, Botryolepraria was not recovered as monophyletic, because additional taxa were included within the clade containing the two currently recognized species (Staurothele spp. in the ITS analysis and Verrucaria elaeina in the LSU analysis), suggesting that broader sampling will be needed to clarify relationships and species limits.

== Description ==
In a structural study of Floridian Botryolepraria material that was genetically closest to B. neotropica, the thallus formed an uncorticated, whitish to light greenish-grey layer with a broadly granular appearance. Under magnification it consisted of a loose, three-dimensional lattice of fungal hyphae, within which distinct clusters of green algal cells were held suspended. Hyphal branches were observed growing both outward from the thallus and back toward algal clusters, and the hyphae fused frequently by anastomosis (including tip-to-tip fusions and short lateral bridges), sometimes completing small ring-like circuits in the lattice.

The aerial hyphae were strongly hydrophobic and often carried a very fine, thread-like surface coating interpreted as a wax-like material; this coating is thought to help keep the open lattice free of surface water in the humid, sheltered sites where the lichen occurs. No sexual reproductive structures (such as perithecia) or specialized vegetative propagules were observed; occasional conidium-like hyphal segments were seen pinching off, but their function was not confirmed. In published species-level comparisons, B. neotropica differs from B. lesdainii in having larger granules (about 200 μm across) and in producing zeorin without lesdainin.

In the Floridian material closest to B. neotropica, the algal partner was placed using rbcL gene sequences in the stichococcoid green-algal genus Pseudostichococcus (family Prasiolaceae), though the sequence was not identical to P. monallantoides.
