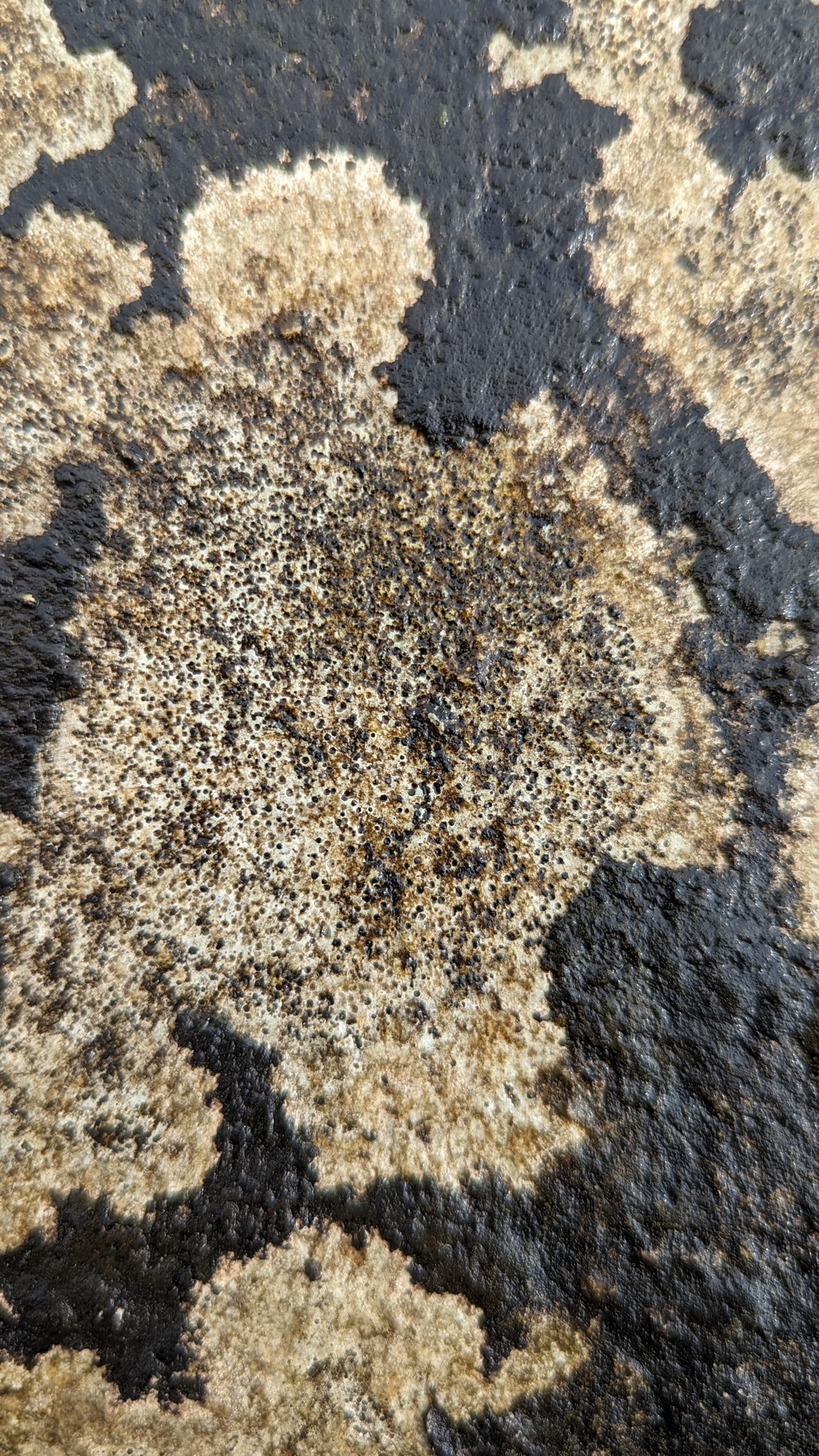

Scientific classification
- Domain: Eukaryota
- Kingdom: Fungi
- Division: Ascomycota
- Class: Eurotiomycetes
- Order: Verrucariales
- Family: Verrucariaceae
- Genus: Polyblastia; A.Massal. (1852)

Type species
- Polyblastia cupularis A.Massal. (1852)

Synonyms
- List: Amphoroblastia Servít (1953); Holosporomyces Cif. & Tomas. (1953); Lithothelidium M.Choisy (1954); Magnussoniolichen Tomas. & Cif. (1952); Magnussoniomyces Cif. & Tomas. (1953); Phillippiregis Cif. & Tomas. (1953); Polyblastia subgen. Polyblastidea Zschacke (1914); Polyblastidea (Zschacke) Tomas. & Cif. (1952); Polyblastiomyces Cif. & Tomas. (1953); Porphyriospora A.Massal. (1852); Raesaeneniolichen Tomas. & Cif. (1952); Raesaeneniomyces Cif. & Tomas. (1953)

= Polyblastia =

Genus of fungi

Polyblastia is a genus of lichenized fungi in the family Verrucariaceae. As of 2020, it consists of about 40 species combined with about 50 orphaned species. The main difference with the genus Verrucaria is related to spores, which are muriform in Polyblastia.

== Species ==
28 species, as accepted by Species Fungorum;

- Polyblastia agraria Th. Fr. (1865)
- Polyblastia albida Arnold (1858)
- Polyblastia aurantia Breuss (2002)
- Polyblastia aurorae Savić & Tibell (2012)
- Polyblastia australis P.M. McCarthy (1995)
- Polyblastia baltica Savić & Tibell (2012)
- Polyblastia borealis Savić & Tibell (2012)
- Polyblastia cataractae Savić & Tibell (2012)
- Polyblastia cupularis A. Massal. (1852)
- Polyblastia dermatodes A. Massal. (1855)
- Polyblastia dimidiata Savić & Tibell (2012)
- Polyblastia efflorescens Coppins (1992)
- Polyblastia fusca Savić & Tibell (2012)
- Polyblastia gothica Th. Fr. (1865)
- Polyblastia helvetica Th. Fr. (1865)
- Polyblastia inconspicua Savić & Tibell (2012)
- Polyblastia inumbrata (Nyl.) Arnold (1871)
- Polyblastia media Savić & Tibell (2012)
- Polyblastia neglecta Savić & Tibell (2012)
- Polyblastia nevoi Zelenko, Breuss & S.Y. Kondr. (2007)
- Polyblastia nordinii Savić & Tibell (2012)
- Polyblastia philaea Zschacke (1933)
- Polyblastia potamophila Savić & Tibell (2012)
- Polyblastia pulchra Savić & Tibell (2012)
- Polyblastia quartzina Lynge (1928)
- Polyblastia sendtneri Kremp. (1855)
- Polyblastia singularis (Kremp.) Arnold (1868)
- Polyblastia verrucosa (Ach.) Lönnr. (1858)
