= Dermatocarpon deminuens =

Scientific classification
- Domain: Eukaryota
- Kingdom: Fungi
- Division: Ascomycota
- Class: Eurotiomycetes
- Order: Verrucariales
- Family: Verrucariaceae
- Genus: Dermatocarpon
- Species: D. deminuens

Binomial name
- Dermatocarpon deminuens Vain. (1921)

Species of lichen

Dermatocarpon deminuens is a species of lichen belonging to the family Verrucariaceae.
