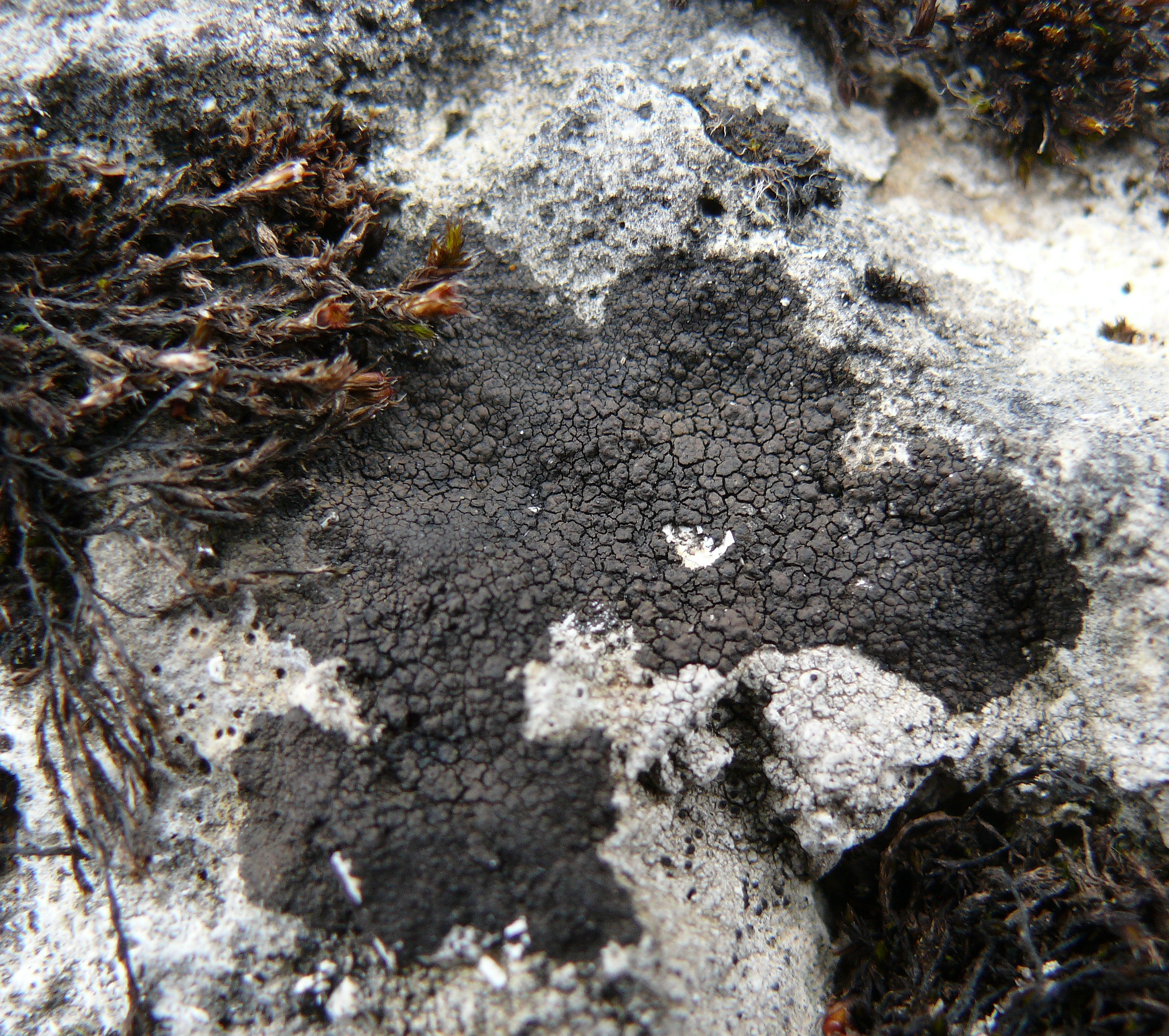

Conservation status
- Secure (NatureServe)

Scientific classification
- Domain: Eukaryota
- Kingdom: Fungi
- Division: Ascomycota
- Class: Eurotiomycetes
- Order: Verrucariales
- Family: Verrucariaceae
- Genus: Verrucaria
- Species: V. nigrescens

Binomial name
- Verrucaria nigrescens Pers. (1795)

Synonyms
- List: Lichen umbrinus Ach. (1799); Verrucaria umbrina var. nigrescens (Pers.) Ach. (1809); Pyrenula nigrescens (Pers.) Ach. (1814); Verrucaria fuscoatra var. nigrescens (Pers.) Wallr. (1831); Tichothecium nigrescens (Pers.) Flot. (1849); Lithoicea nigrescens (Pers.) A.Massal. (1853); Verrucaria fuscoatra var. munda Körb. (1855); Verrucaria controversa var. nigrescens (Pers.) Kremp. (1861); Verrucaria rupestris var. nigrescens (Pers.) Branth & Rostr. (1869); Zschackea nigrescens (Pers.) M.Choisy & Werner (1932); Verrucaria umbrina (Ach.) Ach. (1803); Pyrenula funckii Spreng. (1826); Lithoicea tectorum A.Massal. (1854); Lithoicea tectorum A.Massal. (1855); Verrucaria tectorum (A.Massal.) Körb. (1863); Verrucaria viridula f. tectorum (A.Massal.) J.R.Laundon (1967); Verrucaria nigrescens f. tectorum (A.Massal.) Coppins & Aptroot (2008)

= Verrucaria nigrescens =

Species of lichen in the family Verrucariaceae

Verrucaria nigrescens is a widespread species of crustose lichen in the family Verrucariaceae. First described by Christiaan Hendrik Persoon in 1795, it has maintained its original name despite accumulating many synonyms over its complex taxonomic history. The species is characterised by its dark-brown, areolate (cracked into small polygonal segments) thallus, and commonly colonises stone surfaces, especially limestone. Due to its dark pigmentation, V. nigrescens significantly absorbs sunlight, elevating temperatures on the rock surfaces it inhabits. This contributes to stone deterioration, posing challenges for conservation of historical monuments and buildings, and has prompted research into specialised control methods such as laser cleaning.

== Taxonomy ==
It was first formally described as a new species by Christiaan Hendrik Persoon in 1795. Despite a long and varied taxonomic history during which numerous synonyms have accumulated, the species retains its original name.

== Description ==
Verrucaria nigrescens is a crustose lichen that forms a superficial, dark brown layer varying in thickness from thin to thick (100–500 μm). The thallus (main body) is characteristically divided into small polygonal sections called areoles, which measure 200–800 μm in diameter. These areoles typically have smooth surfaces that range from flat to slightly convex, with occasional blastidiate (bud-like) margins. The sides of these areoles appear brown to blackish in colour.

The lichen generally lacks a prothallus (an initial growth stage visible at the edges), or if present, it is inconspicuous or slightly darker than the main thallus, sometimes visible in the spaces between areoles. Internally, the lichen has a thin upper cortex (protective outer layer) measuring 10–20 μm thick, with a brownish uppermost portion. Beneath this lies the algal layer (30–120 μm thick), where the photosynthetic cells are arranged in approximately vertical columns. The medulla (inner layer) features a distinctive black basal layer comprising half to two-thirds of the thallus thickness.

The reproductive structures, called perithecia, are partially immersed in the thallus (half to three-quarters embedded), with typically one perithecium per areole. The apex (top) of each perithecium ranges from flat to hemispherical in shape. The involucrellum (a protective covering around the perithecium) measures 200–400 μm in diameter and can be hemispherical or extend to the base level of the perithecium. In cross-section, perithecia measure 150–250 μm in diameter, with a dark brown exciple (inner wall of the fruiting body).

The ascospores (spores produced in specialised cells called asci) are ellipsoidal in shape, typically measuring 19–27 by 8–14 μm. Conidiomata (asexual reproductive structures) have not been observed in this species.

== Habitat and distribution ==
Verrucaria nigrescens is a widely distributed species in the Northern Hemisphere. It is typically found growing on sun-exposed limestone, in habitats that are somewhat eutrophic.

== Ecological interactions ==
Verrucaria nigrescens is among several calcicolous lichen species grazed by terrestrial snails. Laboratory studies have shown that three snail species—Balea perversa, Helicigona lapicida, and Clausilia bidentata—intensively graze on V. nigrescens, whereas the snail species Chondrina clienta tends to avoid it. The selective grazing is likely influenced by physical characteristics of the lichen, such as the carbonised tissues, since V. nigrescens does not produce chemical defence metabolites common in other lichens. Snail herbivory has implications for the survival and colonisation strategies of lichens, potentially affecting their population dynamics and ecological interactions on calcareous substrates.

Several species of lichenicolous (lichen-dwelling) fungi have been recorded inhabiting Verrucaria nigrescens populations in Ukraine. These include Endococcus rugulosus, Muellerella lichenicola, Opegrapha opaca, Polycoccum marmoratum, Zwackhiomyces calcisedus, and Zwackhiomyces lithoiceae.

== Conservation and control ==
Verrucaria nigrescens colonises stone surfaces, including historical monuments, sculptures, and buildings, particularly those composed of calcareous substrates such as limestone and dolostone. Its growth leads to aesthetic degradation and contributes to physical and chemical deterioration of stone materials, posing challenges for heritage conservation. Traditional methods for controlling such lichens often involve chemical biocides, which have limited effectiveness and potential environmental risks. Recently, laser cleaning methods, particularly using nanosecond pulsed Nd:YAG lasers (1064 nanometres), have emerged as effective and environmentally friendly alternatives. Studies demonstrate that these laser treatments can successfully remove V. nigrescens thalli from stone surfaces without causing chemical alterations or structural damage to the underlying substrate. The laser irradiation substantially damages the algal and fungal cells within the lichen, including those embedded in deeper stone layers, thereby significantly reducing the likelihood of future recolonisation.

Verrucaria nigrescens contributes to stone deterioration not only through chemical interactions but also through physical processes associated with its dark pigmentation. Research has demonstrated that limestone surfaces colonised by V. nigrescens experience significantly elevated surface and internal rock temperatures compared to bare stone, primarily due to the dark colour of the lichen absorbing more solar radiation. These increased temperatures lead to rapid fluctuations and pronounced thermal gradients between the surface and deeper stone layers, conditions conducive to physical deterioration of the rock. Such thermal stresses may enhance susceptibility to mechanical breakdown, especially in heritage structures and monuments exposed to sunlight.

== See also ==
- List of Verrucaria species
