= Verrucaria rhizicola =

Scientific classification
- Kingdom: Fungi
- Division: Ascomycota
- Class: Eurotiomycetes
- Order: Verrucariales
- Family: Verrucariaceae
- Genus: Verrucaria
- Species: V. rhizicola

Binomial name
- Verrucaria rhizicola Aptroot & Thüs (2011)

Species of lichen

Verrucaria rhizicola is a rare species of corticolous (bark-dwelling), aquatic, crustose lichen in the family Verrucariaceae. It was formally described in 2011 and is known only from a single location in France, where it grows on alder tree roots along a stream in a temperate forest. This aquatic lichen has a distinctive ecological niche, being regularly submerged in fresh water. It is characterised by its dull green thallus, black shiny reproductive structures (apothecia), and uniquely shaped spores.

== Taxonomy ==
The lichen was formally described as a new species in 2011 by lichenologists André Aptroot and Holger Thüs. The type specimen was collected by the first author from the Forêt de Boulogne (Pas-de-Calais). There, the lichen was growing on the roots of common alder (Alnus glutinosa). It is only known from the type collection. The species epithet rhizicola refers to its growth on roots. The roots holding the lichen are located along a stream in a temperate forest, and as such, the lichen is regularly immersed in fresh water. Verrucaria rhizicola is one of about 20 corticolous species in genus Verrucaria. In addition to its uncommon habitat, other unique characteristics of this species are the prominent, minute, shiny ascomata that have a distinctive dimidiate involucrellum (the upper, often pigmented part of ascocarps), and the asymmetrically kidney-shaped ascospores.

== Description ==
The thallus (the main body of the lichen) of Verrucaria rhizicola forms a continuous layer with a slightly uneven surface that appears smooth when viewed from a distance. The thallus has a dull green colour and remains opaque when wet, rather than becoming gelatinous. It measures 25–50 micrometres (μm) in thickness and can spread across areas up to 2 cm in diameter on the upper surfaces of roots. The thallus lacks defined margins with no visible hypothallus (the fungal layer that sometimes extends beyond the main thallus). It also lacks both a blackened basal layer and black dots. Unlike some lichens, this species does not possess a protective cortex layer. The photobiont (the algal partner in the lichen symbiosis) is chlorococcoid, with cells that are round or more commonly ellipsoid to angular in shape. These algal cells are irregularly arranged throughout the thallus and measure approximately 5–10 by 7–15 μm.

The reproductive structures (ascomata) sit on the surface of the thallus, appearing black and shiny, measuring 0.1–0.2 mm in diameter. Each structure has a black protective covering (clypeus) on top that extends outward as a saucer-like flat disc with a smooth surface. This covering extends over the upper one-third to two-thirds of the protective wall (exciple) in some perithecia, occasionally reaching all the way to the base. The lower portion of the exciple ranges from translucent (hyaline) to pale brown in colour. The ostiole (the opening through which spores are released) measures 10–25 μm wide. The hamathecium (the sterile tissue inside the reproductive structure) consists of unbranched, hair-like structures (periphyses) measuring 7–10 by 2–3 μm, embedded in a gel-like substance near the ostiole.

The asci (spore-producing structures) are club-shaped, measuring 25–40 by 9–15 μm. Each ascus contains eight spores. The ascospores (fungal spores) are clear hyaline and elongated-ellipsoid in shape, with an asymmetrical form featuring one flattened side. From certain angles, they appear kidney- or D-shaped, measuring 12–15 by 4.5–6 μm, with an average size of 12 by 5 μm (based on 25 measured specimens). Pycnidia (asexual reproductive structures) have not been observed in this species.

== Habitat and distribution ==
Verrucaria rhizicola is known only from its type locality in France. The species has an unusual ecological niche, being irregularly submerged in fresh water. This habitat distinguishes it among Verrucaria species, as while numerous aquatic species have been described in the genus, only about 20 corticolous species are documented. At its type locality, V. rhizicola grows alongside Porina aenea, in what is described as a lichen-rich forest environment. The ecological flexibility of some lichen species complicates habitat classification, as several species found on submerged alder roots are more commonly known from rock substrates (saxicolous), and some primarily rock-dwelling Verrucaria species occasionally colonize bark.

== See also ==
- List of Verrucaria species
