= Adelococcus =

Scientific classification
- Domain: Eukaryota
- Kingdom: Fungi
- Division: Ascomycota
- Class: Eurotiomycetes
- Order: Verrucariales
- Family: Adelococcaceae
- Genus: Adelococcus; Theiss. & Syd. (1918)

Type species
- Adelococcus alpestris (Zopf) Theiss. & Syd. (1918)

Species
- A. alpestris A. interlatens A. porocyphi

Genus of fungi

Adelococcus is a genus of fungi in the family Adelococcaceae.
