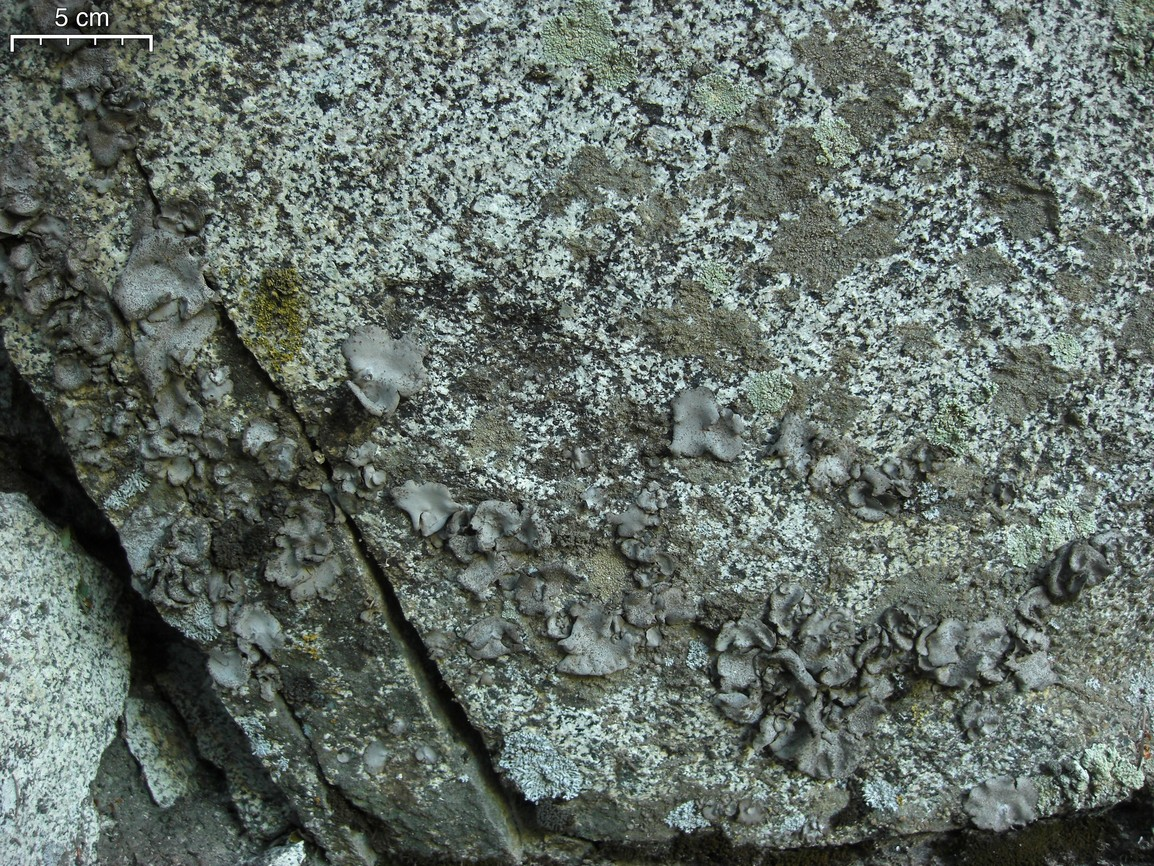
- Dermatocarpon americanum found at Mount Wilson, San Gabriels, so. CA

Scientific classification
- Kingdom: Fungi
- Division: Ascomycota
- Class: Eurotiomycetes
- Order: Verrucariales
- Family: Verrucariaceae
- Genus: Dermatocarpon
- Species: D. americanum

Binomial name
- Dermatocarpon americanum Vain. (1926)

= Dermatocarpon americanum =

Species of lichen-forming fungus

Dermatocarpon americanum, the American stippleback lichen, is a silvery-gray, leafy (foliose) lichen with black dots that is common on near seeps in rock faces from southwestern North American deserts to coastal areas. It has a silvery-dusty looking coating. It is common in deserts on vertical rock surfaces that are partially shade protected near seepages.

It is umbilicate, meaning it grows from a single anchoring stem called a holdfast), with a single-leaf body (thallus), which ranges in size from 1.7–6 cm. The dusty looking top silvery coating on the cortex is dead fungal filaments (hyphae) filled with air (epinecral). The lower surface is light to dark brown. The black dots on the surface are the tops of the holes of flask shaped fruiting bodies that are embedded in the thallus, called perithecia. The perithecia range in shapes from that of an upside down pear (obpyriform) to spherical (globose).

Lichen spot tests are all negative, but the medulla reacts to Meltzer's iodine by turning red, which distinguishes it from D. miniatum, although not all lichenologists find this test to be reliable.
