= Verrucaria madida =

Scientific classification
- Kingdom: Fungi
- Division: Ascomycota
- Class: Eurotiomycetes
- Order: Verrucariales
- Family: Verrucariaceae
- Genus: Verrucaria
- Species: V. madida

Binomial name
- Verrucaria madida Orange (2004)

Species of lichen

Verrucaria madida is a species of saxicolous (rock-dwelling), aquatic, crustose lichen in the family Verrucariaceae. Found in Europe, it was formally described as a new species in 2004 by British lichenologist Alan Orange. The type specimen was collected by the author west of Murat, Cantal, France at an altitude of about 1,000 m (3,300 ft). There it was growing on shallowly submerged rocks in a lightly shaded woodland stream. The lichen has a thin, smooth, dark green to dark greenish-grey thallus with a somewhat gelatinous consistency. The asci (spore-bearing structures) of Verrucaria madida contain four ascospores; this is highly unusual for genus Verrucaria, which typically has eight-spored asci.

In addition to France, Verrucaria madida was reported by Orange to have been found growing on frequently immersed siliceous rocks in streams in South Wales and Norway, although he suggested that it is likely to have been overlooked by collectors and perhaps has a wider European distribution. This was later confirmed when the lichen was reported from the Southern Black Forest in Central Europe, and from Poland. Nearby associates of the Polish specimens were other freshwater lichens: Verrucaria aquatilis, V. hydrela, and Hydropunctaria rheitrophila.

== See also ==
- List of Verrucaria species
