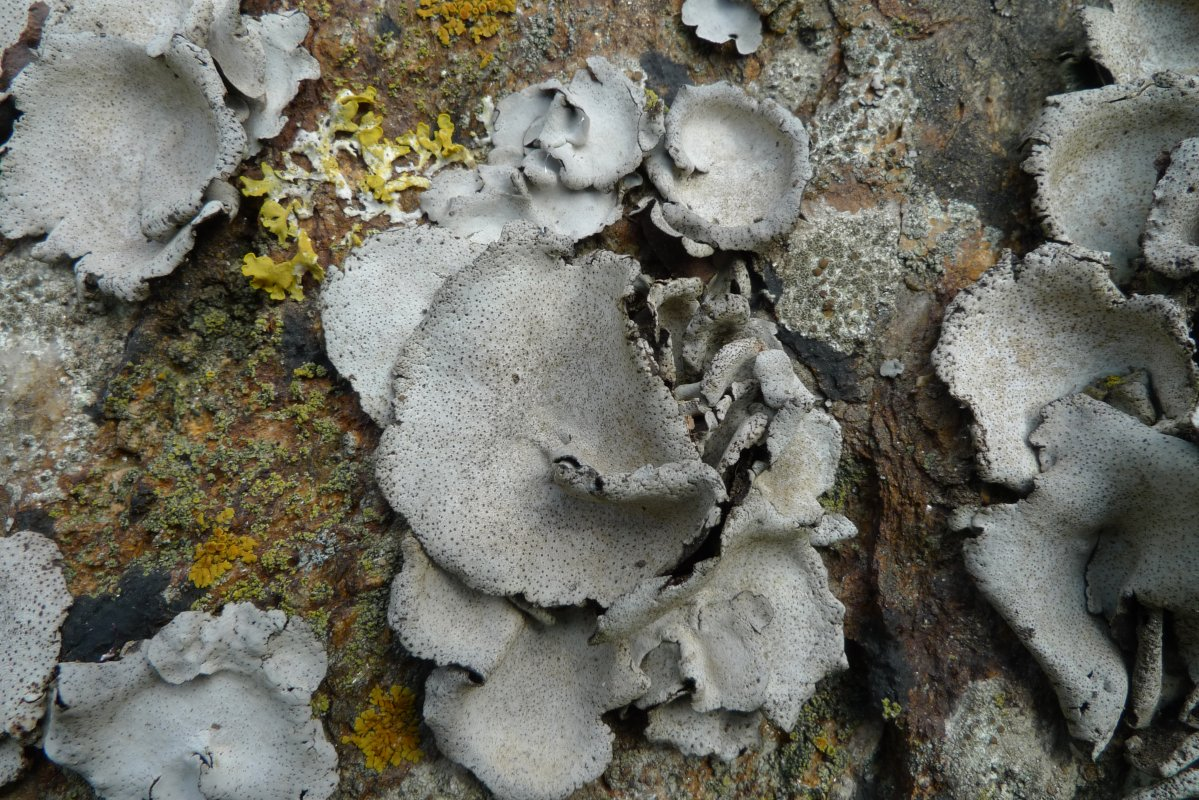
- D. miniatum found in Moëlan-sur-Mer, France

Conservation status
- Secure (NatureServe)

Scientific classification
- Kingdom: Fungi
- Division: Ascomycota
- Class: Eurotiomycetes
- Order: Verrucariales
- Family: Verrucariaceae
- Genus: Dermatocarpon
- Species: D. miniatum

Binomial name
- Dermatocarpon miniatum (L.) W.Mann (1825)

= Dermatocarpon miniatum =

Species of lichen-forming fungus

Dermatocarpon miniatum is a species of lichen-forming fungus in the family Verrucariaceae.

It has cosmopolitan distribution. It is a known host to the lichenicolous fungus species Adelococcus immersus and Halecania alpivaga. The species most commonly grows in dry rock, in areas of high sunlight.

== See also ==
- List of lichens named by Carl Linnaeus
