= Dermatocarpon arnoldianum =

Scientific classification
- Domain: Eukaryota
- Kingdom: Fungi
- Division: Ascomycota
- Class: Eurotiomycetes
- Order: Verrucariales
- Family: Verrucariaceae
- Genus: Dermatocarpon
- Species: D. arnoldianum

Binomial name
- Dermatocarpon arnoldianum Degel. (1934)

Species of lichen

Dermatocarpon arnoldianum, also known vernacularly as Arnold's silverskin lichen, is a species of lichen belonging to the family Verrucariaceae. Part of the genus Dermatocarpon, it has been found in Great Britain, Ireland, Austria, Bulgaria and France.
