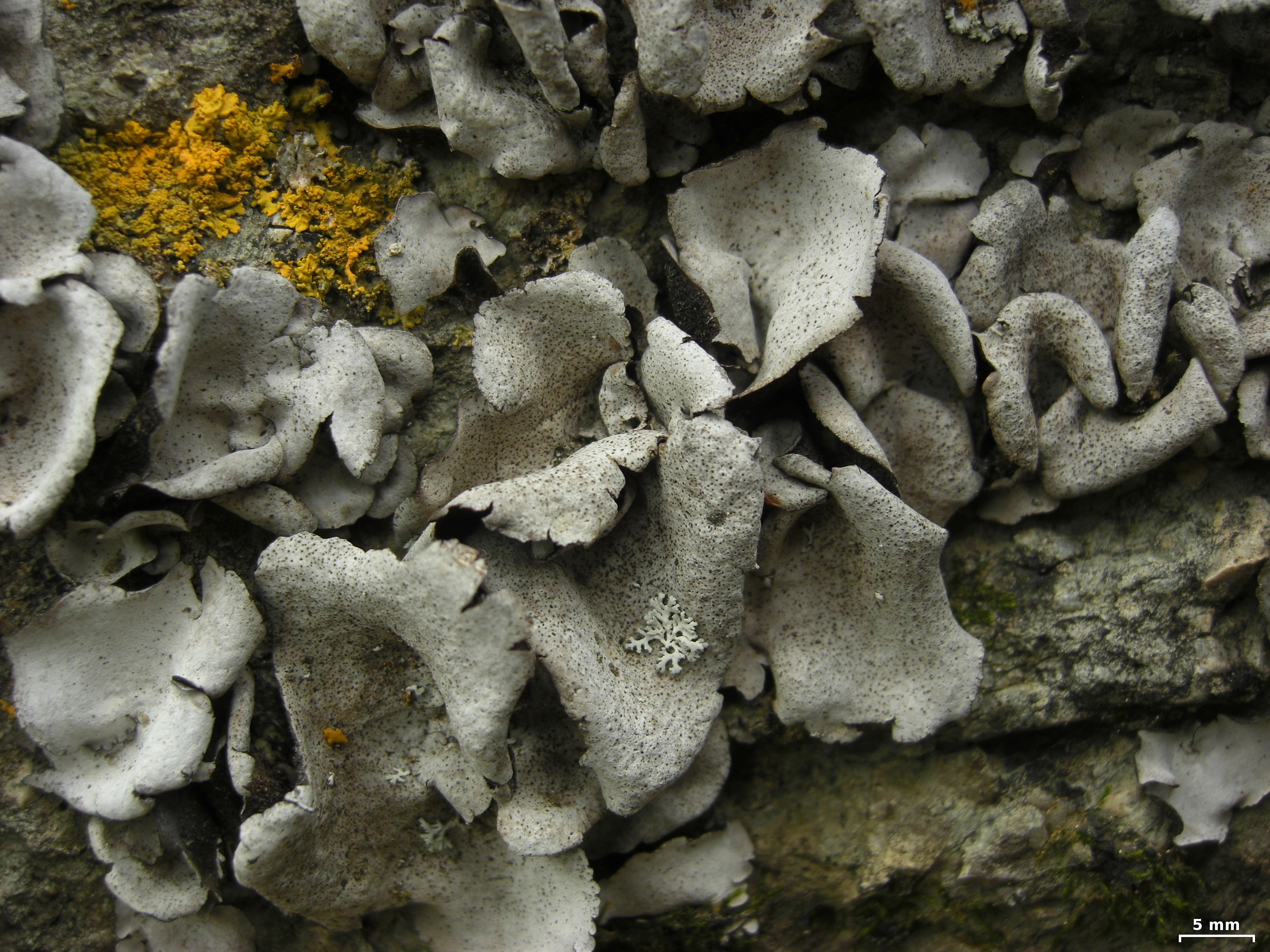

Scientific classification
- Domain: Eukaryota
- Kingdom: Fungi
- Division: Ascomycota
- Class: Eurotiomycetes
- Order: Verrucariales
- Family: Verrucariaceae
- Genus: Dermatocarpon
- Species: D. moulinsii

Binomial name
- Dermatocarpon moulinsii (Mont.) Zahlbr. (1903)

Synonyms
- Endocarpon moulinsii Mont. (1843)

= Dermatocarpon moulinsii =

Species of lichen

Dermatocarpon moulinsii is a species of saxicolous (rock-dwelling), foliose lichen in the family Verrucariaceae. It is distinguished from other members of Dermatocarpon by the presence of rhizines on its underside. In North America, it occurs as mainly a western montane species.

The lichen was originally described by Camille Montagne in 1843 as a species of Endocarpon. It is named after French naturalist Charles des Moulins, who collected the type specimen in France. Alexander Zahlbruckner transferred it to Dermatocarpon in 1903.
