= Pseudopyrenidium =

Scientific classification
- Domain: Eukaryota
- Kingdom: Fungi
- Division: Ascomycota
- Class: Eurotiomycetes
- Order: Verrucariales
- Family: Adelococcaceae
- Genus: Pseudopyrenidium; Nav.-Ros., Zhurb. & Cl.Roux (2010)

Type species
- Pseudopyrenidium tartaricola (Linds.) Nav.-Ros., Zhurb. & Cl.Roux (2010)

Species
- P. epipertusariae P. tartaricola

Genus of lichens

Pseudopyrenidium is a genus of lichenicolous (lichen-dwelling) fungi in the family Adelococcaceae. The genus was circumscribed in 2010 by Père Navarro-Rosinés, Mikhail Zhurbenko, and Claude Roux. It has two species:

- Pseudopyrenidium epipertusariae Etayo & Pino-Bodas (2021) – host: Pertusaria pertusa
- Pseudopyrenidium tartaricola (Linds.) Nav.-Ros., Zhurb. & Cl.Roux (2010) – host: Ochrolechia
