= Dermatocarpon leptophyllodes =

Scientific classification
- Domain: Eukaryota
- Kingdom: Fungi
- Division: Ascomycota
- Class: Eurotiomycetes
- Order: Verrucariales
- Family: Verrucariaceae
- Genus: Dermatocarpon
- Species: D. leptophyllodes

Binomial name
- Dermatocarpon leptophyllodes (Nyl.) Vain. ex Hav.

Synonyms
- Endocarpon leptophyllodes Nyl. (1876); basionym

Species of lichen

Dermatocarpon leptophyllodes is a species of lichen belonging to the family Verrucariaceae.
