= Sagediopsis =

Scientific classification
- Domain: Eukaryota
- Kingdom: Fungi
- Division: Ascomycota
- Class: Eurotiomycetes
- Order: Verrucariales
- Family: Adelococcaceae
- Genus: Sagediopsis; Sacc. ex Vain.

Type species
- Sagediopsis tartarina (Nyl.) Vain.

Synonyms
- Metasphaeria subgen. Sagediopsis Sacc. & D.Sacc. (1905)

Genus of fungi

Sagediopsis is a genus of fungi in the family Adelococcaceae.

== Species ==
- Sagediopsis aquatica (Stein) Triebel (1989)
- Sagediopsis aspiciliae (Zopf ex Sacc.) Nik.Hoffm. & Hafellner (2000)
- Sagediopsis barbara (Th.Fr.) R.Sant. & Triebel (1989)
- Sagediopsis campsteriana (Linds.) D.Hawksw. & R.Sant. (1990)
- Sagediopsis epimalvinae Etayo, T.B.Wheeler & Fryday (2021) – Falkland Islands
- Sagediopsis lomnitzensis (Stein) Orange (2002)
- Sagediopsis pertusariicola Zhurb. (2009)
- Sagediopsis vasilyevae Zhurb. (2014)
