= Dermatocarpon tomentulosum =

Scientific classification
- Domain: Eukaryota
- Kingdom: Fungi
- Division: Ascomycota
- Class: Eurotiomycetes
- Order: Verrucariales
- Family: Verrucariaceae
- Genus: Dermatocarpon
- Species: D. tomentulosum

Binomial name
- Dermatocarpon tomentulosum Amtoft (2006)

Species of lichen

Dermatocarpon tomentulosum is a species of lichen belonging to the family Verrucariaceae. A rare species, it is known only to a few localities in North America—Missouri and Texas in the United States, and Cat Island and New Providence in the Bahamas.
