= Verrucaria rupestris =

Conservation status
- Apparently Secure (NatureServe)

Scientific classification
- Domain: Eukaryota
- Kingdom: Fungi
- Division: Ascomycota
- Class: Eurotiomycetes
- Order: Verrucariales
- Family: Verrucariaceae
- Genus: Verrucaria
- Species: V. rupestris

Binomial name
- Verrucaria rupestris Schrad. (1794)

Species of lichen

Verrucaria rupestris is a species of lichen belonging to the family Verrucariaceae.

== See also ==
- List of Verrucaria species
