= Dermatocarpon meiophyllizum =

Conservation status
- Apparently Secure (NatureServe)

Scientific classification
- Domain: Eukaryota
- Kingdom: Fungi
- Division: Ascomycota
- Class: Eurotiomycetes
- Order: Verrucariales
- Family: Verrucariaceae
- Genus: Dermatocarpon
- Species: D. meiophyllizum

Binomial name
- Dermatocarpon meiophyllizum Vain. (1921)

Synonyms
- Dermatocarpon bachmannii Klem. (1932); Dermatocarpon meiophyllum Vain. (1921); Placidiopsis meiophylliza Vain. (1956)

Species of lichen

Dermatocarpon meiophyllizum is a species of lichen belonging to the family Verrucariaceae.
