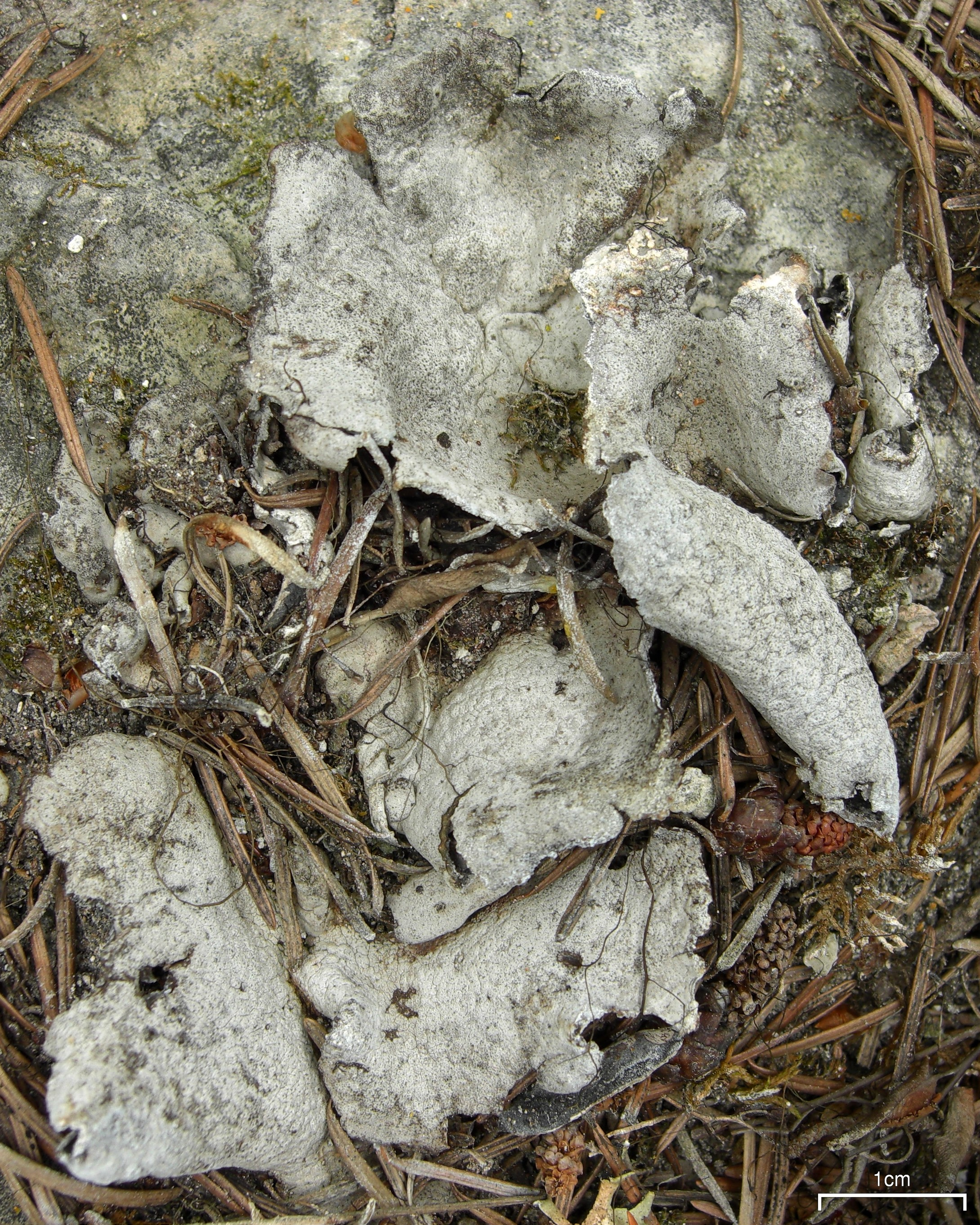
- scale bar = 1 cm

Scientific classification
- Domain: Eukaryota
- Kingdom: Fungi
- Division: Ascomycota
- Class: Eurotiomycetes
- Order: Verrucariales
- Family: Verrucariaceae
- Genus: Dermatocarpon
- Species: D. atrogranulosum

Binomial name
- Dermatocarpon atrogranulosum Breuss (2003)

= Dermatocarpon atrogranulosum =

Species of lichen

Dermatocarpon atrogranulosum, commonly known as the charred stippleback, is a species of saxicolous (rock-dwelling) lichen in the family Verrucariaceae. It is found in a few locations in British Columbia, Canada, where it grows on limestone outcrops. It was formally described as a new species in 2003 by Austrian lichenologist Othmar Breuss. It is one of 24 Dermatocarpon species known to occur in northern North America.
