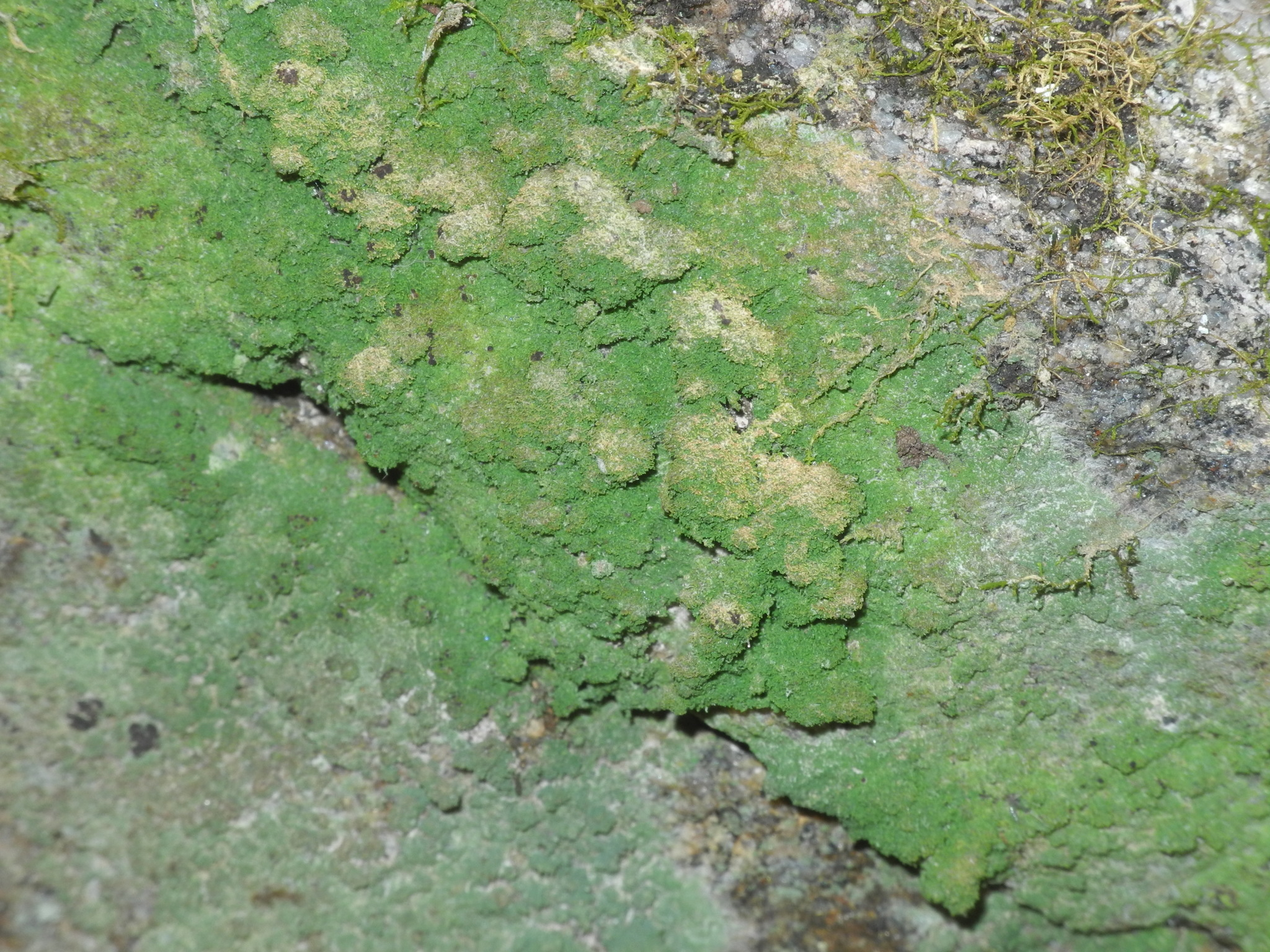
- Botryolepraria lesdainii

Scientific classification
- Kingdom: Fungi
- Division: Ascomycota
- Class: Eurotiomycetes
- Order: Verrucariales
- Genus: Botryolepraria; Canals, Hern.-Mar., Gómez-Bolea & Llimona (1997)

Type species
- Botryolepraria lesdainii (Hue) Canals, Hern.-Mar., Gómez-Bolea & Llimona (1997)

Species
- B. lesdainii B. neotropica

= Botryolepraria =

Genus of lichen-forming fungi

Botryolepraria is a genus of byssoid (cottony) lichens of uncertain familial placement in the order Verrucariales. It has two species. The thallus is an uncorticated, three-dimensional network of free fungal hyphae that holds clusters of green algal cells suspended within the lattice, so under low magnification it can resemble a pale, granular Lepraria-like crust. Reports are mostly from shady, humid, protected microhabitats on sheltered rock (often limestone) or on tree bark, including cave entrances and damp woodland or swamp habitats.

== Taxonomy ==
The genus was circumscribed by Antonio Canals, Mariona Hernández-Mariné, Antonio Gómez-Bolea, and Xavier Llimona in 1997, as a segregate of genus Lepraria, with the widespread and common lichen B. lesdainii as the type, and at that time, only species. The type specimen was collected by French lichenologist Maurice Bouly de Lesdain from a wall in Les Baraques (Calais, France). The genus name combines the Greek-derived botryon ("cluster of berries", referring to the microscopic shrub-like clusters of fungal hyphae and spherical algal cells) with its namesake genus, Lepraria.

Although some later authors did not accept the proposed genus as different from Lepraria, later molecular analysis showed it to be genetically distinct. Although presumed to be a member of the Lecanoromycetes, its precise classification was not clarified. The genus has subsequently been accepted by most lichenologists, and is considered to be a member of the Verrucariales with uncertain familial placement. A second species, found in the Neotropics, was added to Botryolepraria in 2010. Both species have similar morphology and secondary chemistry.

A 2025 study that sequenced Floridian material identified as Botryolepraria sp. using fungal ITS and LSU markers supported placement of the genus within Verrucariales, but neither analysis recovered Botryolepraria as monophyletic. In both trees, additional taxa were included within the clade containing the two currently recognised species (Staurothele spp. in the ITS analysis, and Verrucaria elaeina in the LSU analysis), suggesting that wider sampling will be needed to resolve relationships and species limits.

== Description ==
Botryolepraria forms an uncorticated, whitish to light greenish-grey thallus with a broadly granular, cloud-like appearance. Under a hand lens, the pale colour comes from a loose, three-dimensional lattice of hyphae, while the green colour is concentrated in discrete clusters of algal cells that are held and suspended within that lattice. During growth, some hyphal branches extend outward from the thallus, while others reorient and grow back toward algal clusters; neighbouring hyphae also fuse frequently (anastomose) tip-to-tip or via short bridging connections, producing small loops and cross-links that help stabilize the aerial network. Around algal clusters, hyphae commonly grow over and between dividing algal cells, separating and redistributing the photobiont cells as the lattice expands.

The aerial hyphae are strongly hydrophobic and are often coated with a very fine, thread-like surface material that has been compared with some forms of plant epicuticular wax. This open construction, together with the hydrophobic coating, has been interpreted as an adaptation to persist in very humid, sheltered sites by limiting surface condensation and maintaining air spaces needed for gas exchange within the thallus.

No sexual reproductive structures (such as perithecia) have been confirmed in the genus, and specialized vegetative propagules are also unknown. Thalli are thought to spread mainly by fragmentation, and occasional conidium-like hyphal segments have been observed but their role remains uncertain. Botryolepraria lesdainii produces lesdainin (6-α-acetoxyhopan-22-ol), a terpenoid compound; zeorin is an accompanying lichen product that also occurs in B. neotropica.

Molecular data from recently studied material placed the photobiont in a stichococcoid green-algal lineage (genus Pseudostichococcus; Prasiolaceae), while earlier studies reported different tentative identifications based on cultured material, so the algal partner may vary across the genus's broad range.

== Habitat and distribution ==
Reports of Botryolepraria are mostly from shady, humid, protected microhabitats where the thallus is sheltered from direct exposure. The genus was first documented from limestone near dim cave entrances, but it has also been collected on tree bark in very damp habitats (for example, on old-growth Taxodium trunks in a Floridian cypress swamp). Published records span multiple continents, including Europe, Asia, Africa, North America, and the Neotropics.

== Species ==
- Botryolepraria lesdainii (Hue) Canals, Hern.-Mar., Gómez-Bolea & Llimona (1997) – temperate regions of Asia, Europe, Canary Islands; northern North America
- Botryolepraria neotropica Kukwa & Pérez-Ort. (2010) – Bolivia, Cuba, Peru
