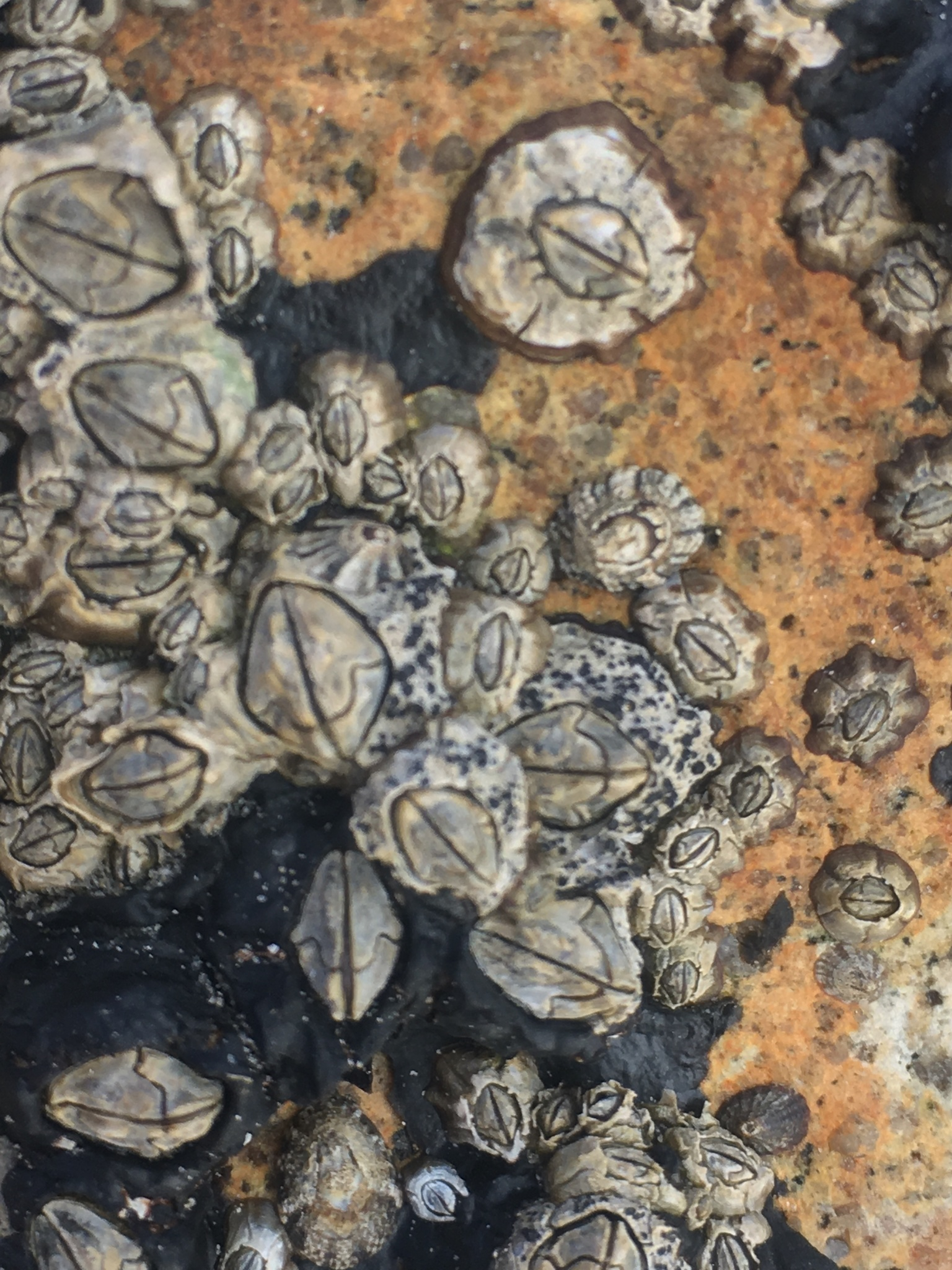
- Thelidium litorale

Scientific classification
- Kingdom: Fungi
- Division: Ascomycota
- Class: Eurotiomycetes
- Order: Verrucariales
- Family: Verrucariaceae
- Genus: Thelidium; A.Massal. (1855)

Type species
- Thelidium amylaceum A.Massal. (1855)

Species
- See text

Synonyms
- List: Acrotellomyces Cif. & Tomas. (1953); Acrotellum Tomas. & Cif. (1952); Bottariomyces Cif. & Tomas. (1953); Bunodea A.Massal. (1855); Chrooicia Trevis. (1861); Clypeosphaeria subgen. Starbaeckiella Sacc. & P.Syd. (1902); Coenicia Trevis. (1861); Coenoicia Trevis. (1861); Involucrothele Servít (1953); Melanotheca Fée (1837); Mycopyrenula Vain. (1921); Papulare Tomas. & Cif. (1952); Papulariomyces Cif. & Tomas. (1953); Paraphysothele Zschacke (1934); Parmentaria Fée (1825); Parmentariomyces Cif. & Tomas. (1953); Parmentieria Trevis. (1860); Phragmothele Clem. (1909); Plagiothelium Stirt. (1881); Pleamphisphaeria Höhn. (1919); Pleurotheliopsis Zahlbr. (1922); Pleurothelium Müll.Arg. (1885); Pyrenastromyces Cif. & Tomas. (1953); Pyrenophoromyces Cif. & Tomas. (1953); Pyrenophorum Tomas. & Cif. (1952); Pyrenula Ach. (1809); Starbaeckiella (Sacc. & P.Syd.) Syd. & P.Syd. (1919); Thelidiomyces Cif. & Tomas. (1953); Titanella Syd. & P.Syd. (1919)

= Thelidium =

Genus of lichens

Thelidium is a genus of lichen-forming fungi in the family Verrucariaceae. The genus was established in 1855 by the Italian lichenologist Abramo Bartolommeo Massalongo, who distinguished it from related genera by its point-like fruiting bodies with distinctive double walls and granular spores. These lichens form thin crusts on rock surfaces and reproduce through tiny, black, flask-shaped structures that contain spores. The genus includes about 27 species found worldwide, ranging from common European species to more recently discovered ones from Asia and Australia.

== Taxonomy ==
The genus was circumscribed in 1855 by Italian lichenologist Abramo Bartolommeo Massalongo, who assigned Thelidium amylaceum as the type species. Massalongo established Thelidium to accommodate a group of lichens characterised by their immersed, sessile, punctiform (point-like) apothecia with hemispherical to conical, papillate fruits and nearly double exciples. He distinguished the genus by its exterior substance being primary thalline material, contrasting with the interior fungal tissue, and noted the presence of granular, moniliform sporidia. In his original description, Massalongo included six species: T. amylaceum (the type), T. arianum, T. pyrenophorum, T. epipolaeum, T. zwackii, and T. rubellum, along with the uncertain T. diaboli. He observed that the genus was closely related to Polyblastia, Thelotrema, and Sagedia, noting particular similarities in spore characteristics, and commented that all these species shared diverse morphological features that nevertheless maintained consistent fundamental characteristics.

== Description ==
Thelidium forms a thin, crust-like thallus that either sits on the rock surface or is partly sunk into it. The crust can be white, various shades of green or grey, or a weathered brown, and some species contain extra brown or dull-green pigments that give the lichen a mottled look; very rarely the surface shows orange-yellow or purple tones. The outer skin (cortex) is poorly developed, so the thallus often blends into the substrate, and powdery propagules (soredia) are uncommon. When present, the photosynthetic partner is a green alga.

The sexual fruit bodies are perithecia—minute, black, more or less spherical flasks that may be fully exposed on the thallus or lodged within it, and in deeply eroding species they can even lie buried in the rock surface. Many species develop an extra cup-shaped covering called an involucrellum that partially overhangs the upper half of the perithecium. Inside the fruit body, only two kinds of slender filaments occur: periphyses that line the neck and periphysoids that project into the spore cavity; the more typical paraphyses found in many crustose lichens are absent. The jelly that cements these filaments shows a diagnostic iodine staining reaction—turning red (and blue at very low iodine concentrations), then deep blue after treatment with potassium iodide—helpful for separating Thelidium from look-alikes.

Each ascus is narrowly club-shaped (clavate) with a thickened upper wall and a tiny "window" (ocular chamber) through which the spores are released. At maturity the inner ascus wall (endotunica) elongates into a fine beak that forces its way through the neck, discharging eight spores at a time. Ascospores are colourless, smooth and thin-walled, most often divided by one to three cross-walls (septa), though some species occasionally add a longitudinal wall or two. No specialised asexual structures are known. Apart from an acetone-soluble quinone pigment confined to a single species, the genus relies on a small palette of acetone-insoluble pigments that stain the thallus brown or reddish-brown; these pigments darken or take on a greenish tinge in potassium hydroxide solution, providing an additional field test for the group.

== Species ==
- Thelidium amylaceum A.Massal. (1855)
- Thelidium carbonaceum P.M.McCarthy & Kantvilas (2020) – Australia
- Thelidium chibaense H.Harada (2013) – Japan
- Thelidium decipiens (Hepp) Kremp. (1861)
- Thelidium fontigenum A.Massal. (1856)
- Thelidium fumidum (Nyl.) Hazsl. (1884)
- Thelidium heardense C.W.Dodge (1948)
- Thelidium helveticum (Servít) Hafellner (2018)
- Thelidium impressum (Müll.Arg.) Zschacke (1920)
- Thelidium incavatum Nyl. ex Mudd (1861)
- Thelidium izuense H.Harada (2013) – Japan
- Thelidium litorale (Leight.) Keissl. (1937)
- Thelidium luchunense H.Harada & Li S.Wang (2006) – China
- Thelidium methorium (Nyl.) Hellb. (1875)
- Thelidium minimum (A.Massal. ex Körb.) Arnold (1871)
- Thelidium minutulum Körb. (1863)
- Thelidium nylanderi (Hepp) Lönnr. (1859)
- Thelidium papulare (Fr.) Arnold (1885)
- Thelidium pluvium Orange (1991) – Europe
- Thelidium praevalescens (Nyl.) Zahlbr. (1906)
- Thelidium pyrenophorellum (Servít) Hafellner (2018)
- Thelidium pyrenophorum (Ach.) Körb. (1855)
- Thelidium rimosulum Ceyn.-Giełd. (2007) – Europe
- Thelidium robustum P.M.McCarthy & Kantvilas (2016)
- Thelidium sinense H.Harada & Li S.Wang (2006) – China
- Thelidium uvidulum Orange (2022) – Nepal
- Thelidium yunnanum H.Harada & Li S.Wang (2004) – China
- Thelidium zwackhii (Hepp) A.Massal. (1855)
