= Gemmaspora =

Scientific classification
- Kingdom: Fungi
- Division: Ascomycota
- Class: Eurotiomycetes
- Order: Verrucariales
- Genus: Gemmaspora; D.Hawksw. & Halıcı (2007)
- Species: G. lecanorae

Binomial name
- Gemmaspora lecanorae (Werner) D.Hawksw. & Halıcı (2007)

Synonyms
- Adelococcus lecanorae Werner (1964)

Single-species fungal genus

Gemmaspora is a single-species fungal genus of uncertain familial placement in the order Verrucariales. It contains Gemmaspora lecanorae, a lichenicolous (lichen-dwelling) fungus that parasitises the lichen genus Aspicilia. The genus was proposed in 2007 by David Hawksworth and Gökhan Halici to contain the fungus formerly known as Adelococcus lecanorae. This species, originally described by Roger-Guy Werner in 1963, occurs in Syria and Turkey.
