= Kalbiana =

Scientific classification
- Kingdom: Fungi
- Division: Ascomycota
- Class: Eurotiomycetes
- Order: Verrucariales
- Genus: Kalbiana; Henssen (1988)
- Species: K. brasiliensis

Binomial name
- Kalbiana brasiliensis Henssen (1988)

Species of lichen

Kalbiana is a genus of saxicolous (rock-dwelling), crustose lichen of uncertain familial placement in the order Verrucariales. Both the genus and its only species, Kalbiana brasiliensis, were described in 1988 by lichenologist Aino Henssen. The genus name honours German lichenologist Klaus Kalb, while the species epithet refers to Brazil, where the lichen is found.
