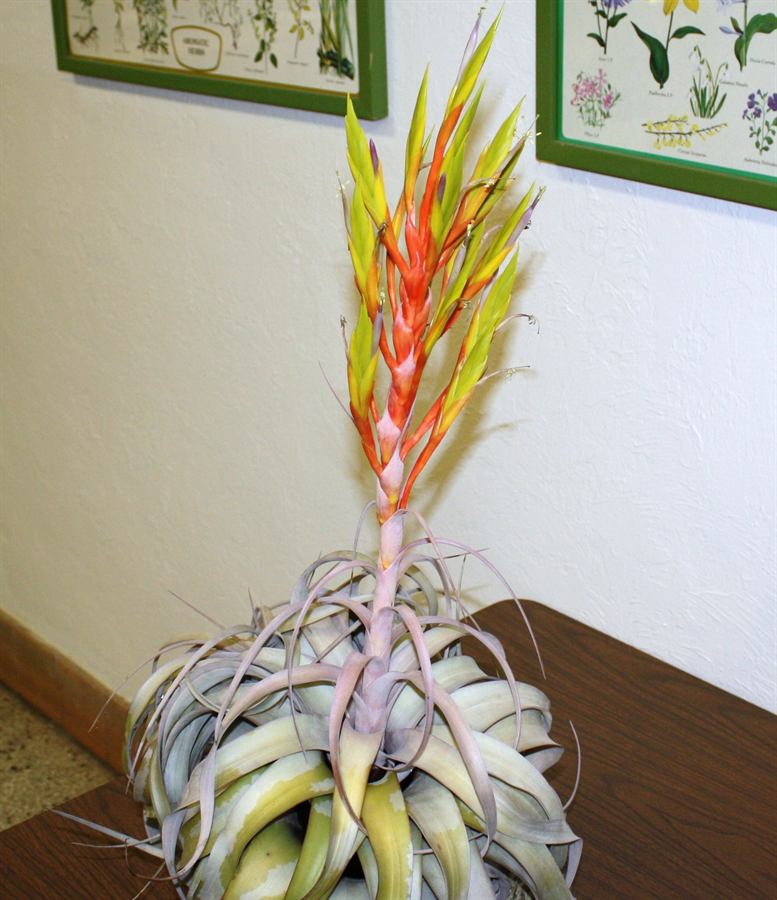

Conservation status
- CITES Appendix II

Scientific classification
- Kingdom: Plantae
- Clade: Tracheophytes
- Clade: Angiosperms
- Clade: Monocots
- Clade: Commelinids
- Order: Poales
- Family: Bromeliaceae
- Genus: Tillandsia
- Subgenus: Tillandsia subg. Tillandsia
- Species: T. xerographica

Binomial name
- Tillandsia xerographica Rohweder

Synonyms
- Tillandsia kruseana Matuda; Tillandsia xerographica f. variegata Moffler; Tillandsia tomasellii De Luca, Sabato & Balduzzi

= Tillandsia xerographica =

Species of plant

Tillandsia xerographica is a species of flowering plant in the bromeliad family. It is native to southern Mexico, El Salvador, Guatemala and Honduras. The name is derived from the Greek words ξηρός (xeros), meaning "dry", and γραφία (graphia), meaning "writing". It is included in Tillandsia subg. Tillandsia.

== Description ==
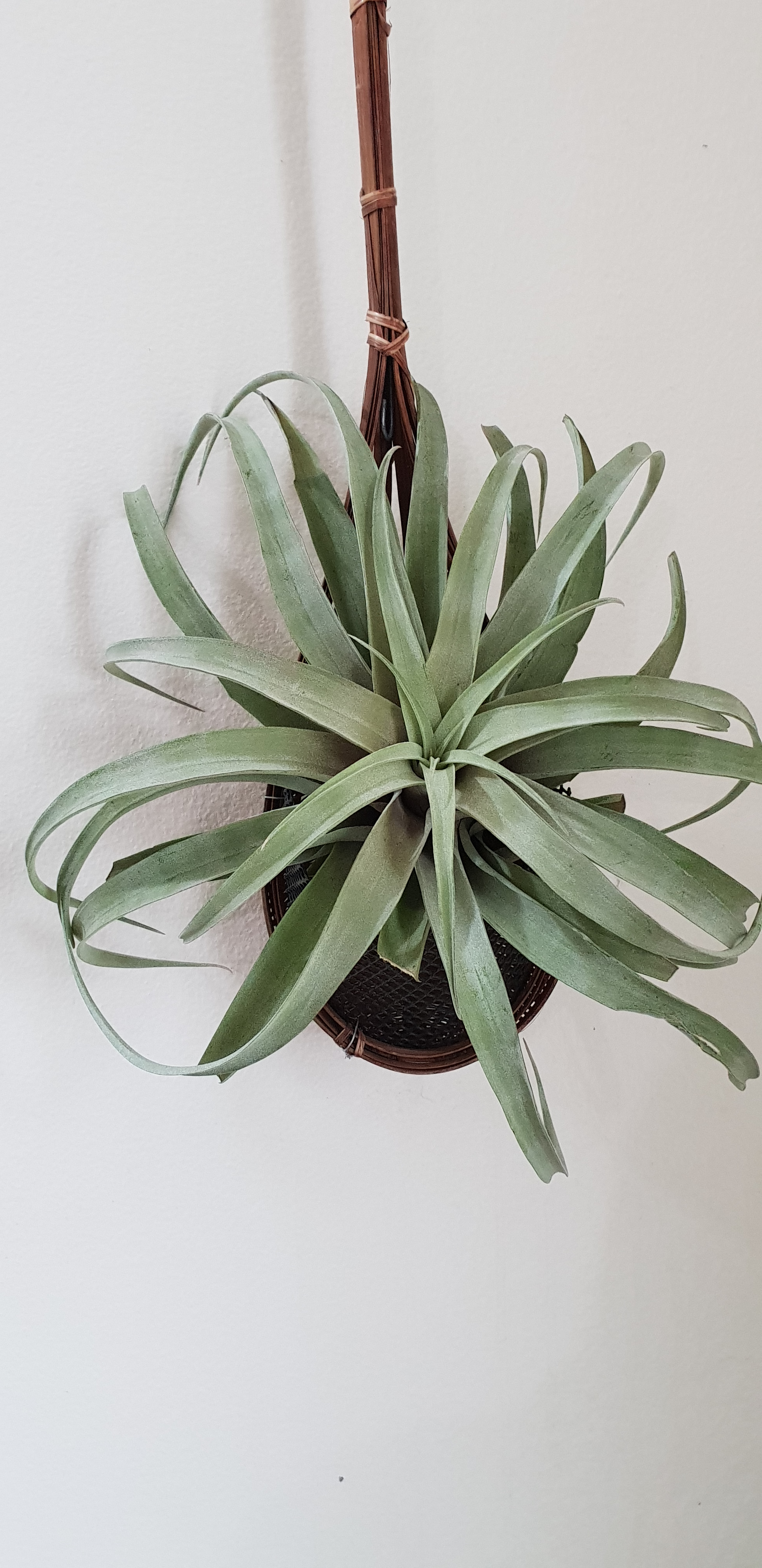
Tillandsia xerographica

Tillandsia xerographica is a slow-growing, xerophytic epiphyte. The greenish silver leaves are wide at the base and taper to a point making an attractive, sculptural rosette, 90 cm (3 ft) or more in diameter and over 90 cm (3 ft) high in flower. The inflorescence, on a thick, green stem, 150–380 mm (6–15 in) in height, is densely branched. The leaf bracts are rosy red; the floral bracts are chartreuse; and the petals of the tubular flowers are red to purple and are very long lasting (months).

== Habitat ==
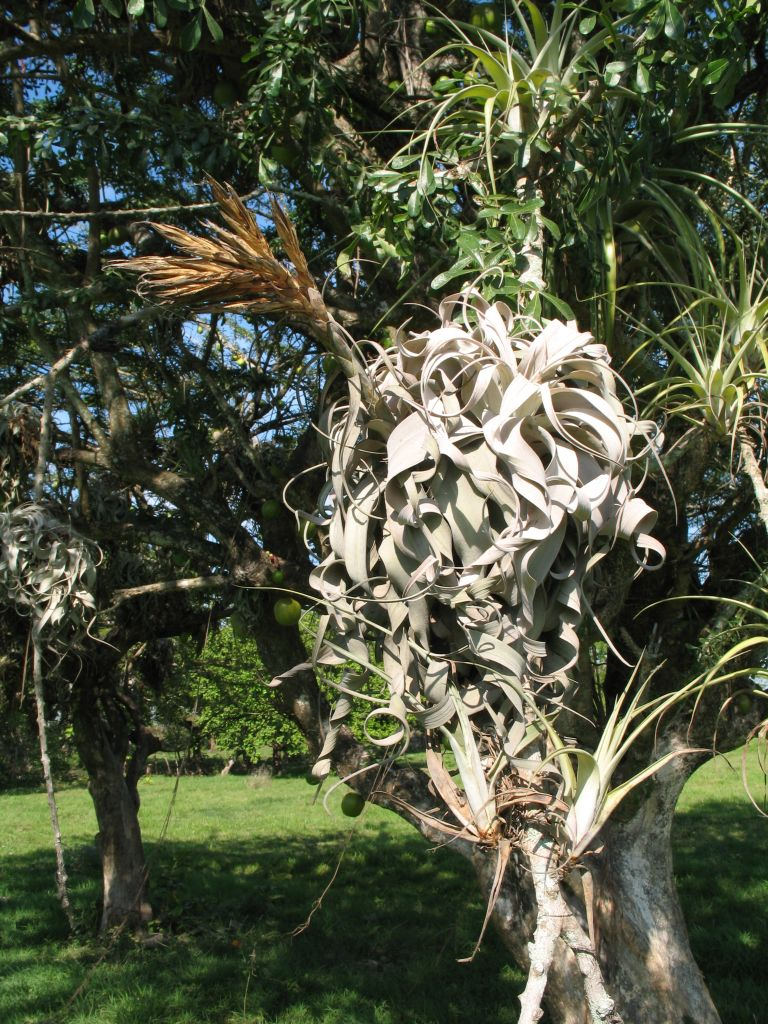
Tillandsia xerographica in its natural habitat in El Salvador near Los Cobanos beach

Tillandsia xerographica inhabits dry forests and thorn scrub at elevations of 140 to 600 m in southern Mexico, Guatemala and El Salvador. Average temperatures in its habitat range from 22 °C to 28 °C, with relative humidity between 60% and 72% and annual precipitation between 550 and 800 mm. It grows epiphytically on the highest branches, where it receives intense lighting.

== Cultivars ==
- Tillandsia 'Betty' (T. xerographica × T. brachycaulos)
- Tillandsia 'Fireworks' (T. xerographica × T. roland-gosselinii)
- Tillandsia 'Silver Queen' (T. jalisco-monticola × T. xerographica)
- Tillandsia 'Silverado' (T. chiapensis × T. xerographica)
