= Georg Hermann Zschacke =

German lichenologist (1867–1937)

- Born: 27 May 1867; Köthen, Germany
- Died: 19 September 1937 (aged 70); Bernburg, Germany
- Awards: Order of Merit for Science and Art
- Scientific career
- Fields: Lichenology
- Author abbrev. (botany): Zschacke

Georg Hermann Zschacke (27 May 1867–19 September 1937) was a German teacher and lichenologist. His specialty was the lichen family Verrucariaceae, about which he wrote many publications.

== Biography ==
Zschake was born in Köthen on 27 May 1867. As a student he showed interest in the natural sciences, and started collecting specimens for his herbarium. From 1885 on he focussed his attention to cryptogams, i.e., lichens and mosses. In 1892 Zschake became a secondary school teacher (for mathematics and natural sciences) in Hecklingen and from 1898 in Bernburg.

Zschake was surprised by the start of the war while on a collecting trip to Corsica in 1914. He was interned in the prison of Bastia, and later in the civil prison camp of the Corbara monastery near L'Île-Rousse. After becoming seriously ill, he was transferred to Switzerland in 1916 for therapy; this change of locales later led to Zschake writing a thesis on the lichen flora of the Davos valley. Parts of the collections that he had made in Corsica before his arrest were confiscated and published in 1926 by the French lichenologists Jacques Marie Albert Maheu and Abel Gillet – without contacting him (as Zschack bitterly noted in 1927). From 1917 until 1924 he was again a teacher in Berburg, then, due to illness, took early retirement. Zschake was particularly interested in pyrenocarpous lichens (i.e., those with perithecium-like ascocarps), particularly the large genus Verrucaria and similar genera, and he had a reputation as a connoisseur of the lichen family Verrucariaceae as a result of his numerous publications on the subject.

Zschake died in Bernburg on 19 September 1937, from health problems resulting from his war-time experiences. His botanical collections that were stored in Berlin-Dahlem survived the 1943 bombing and destruction of the Botanical Museum, as his specimens had not been yet been incorporated into the main collection.

== Recognition ==
In 1917 Zschake was awarded the Order of Merit for Science and Art by the Duke of Anhalt. Zschackia, a series of lichenological web-publications hosted by the Berlin Botanical Garden and Botanical Museum, is dedicated to Zschacke.

=== Eponyms ===
The genus Zschackea M.Choisy & Werner (1932) (now synonymised with Verrucaria) was named in honour of Zschacke. Species that have been named after him include: Verrucaria zschackeana Erichsen (1930); Catillaria zschackei Eitner (1911); Endocarpon zschackei M.Choisy (1954); and Verrucaria zschackei Riedl (1990).

== Selected publications ==
- Zschacke, Hermann (1913). "Die mitteleuropäischen Verrucariaceen. I" [The Central European Verrucariacea. I]. Hedwigia (in German). 54: 183–198.
- Zschacke, Hermann (1914). "Die mitteleuropäischen Verrucariaceen. II". Hedwigia (in German). 55: 286–324.
- Zschacke, Hermann (1918). "Die mitteleuropäischen Verrucariaceen. Nachträge zu I und II". Hedwigia (in German). 60: 1–9.
- Zschacke, Hermann (1921). "Die mitteleuropäischen Verrucariaceen. III". Hedwigia (in German). 62: 90–154.
- Zschacke, Hermann (1924). "Die mitteleuropäischen Verrucariaceen. IV". Hedwigia (in German). 65: 46–64.
- Zschacke, Hermann (1927). "Die mitteleuropäischen Verrucariaceen. V". Hedwigia (in German). 67: 45–85.
- Zschacke, Hermann (1933–1934). "Epigloeaceae, Verrucariaceae, Dermatocarpaceae". Dr. L. Rabenhorst's Kryptogamen-Flora von Deutschland, Oesterreich und der Schweiz. Vol. 9 (2 ed.).

== See also ==
- Category:Taxa named by Georg Hermann Zschacke
