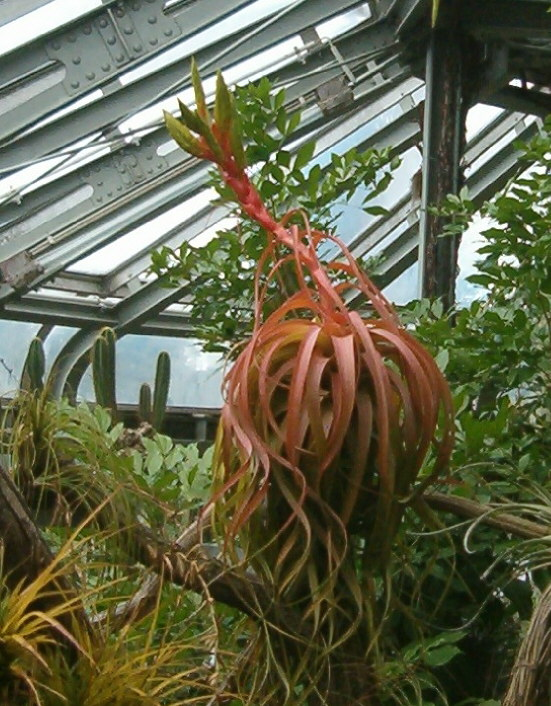

Scientific classification
- Kingdom: Plantae
- Clade: Embryophytes
- Clade: Tracheophytes
- Clade: Spermatophytes
- Clade: Angiosperms
- Clade: Monocots
- Clade: Commelinids
- Order: Poales
- Family: Bromeliaceae
- Genus: Tillandsia
- Subgenus: Tillandsia subg. Tillandsia
- Species: T. roland-gosselinii

Binomial name
- Tillandsia roland-gosselinii Mez

= Tillandsia roland-gosselinii =

Species of plant

Tillandsia roland-gosselinii is a species of flowering plant in the family Bromeliaceae. This species is endemic to Mexico.

== Cultivars ==
Recognized cultivars include:

- Tillandsia 'Fireworks'
- Tillandsia 'Flagstaff'
- Tillandsia 'Madre'
- Tillandsia 'Padre'
