= Order of Merit for Science and Art =

Order of Merit for Science and Art Verdienstorden für Wissenschaft und Kunst
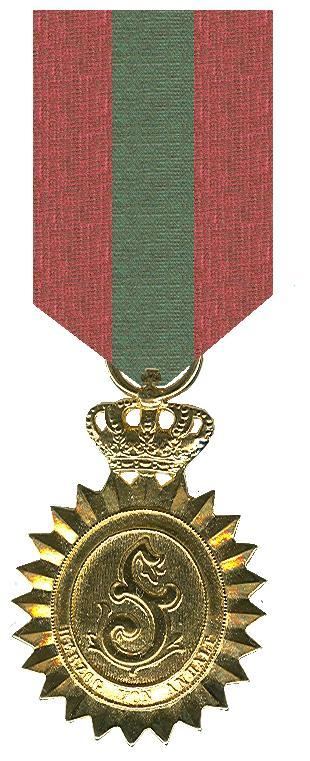
- Medal of the order
- Type: Three class Order
- Awarded for: Excellent and outstanding achievements in the field of science and art
- Description: no longer awarded
- Presented by: Anhalt
- Eligibility: German and foreign civilians
- Established: 30 July 1873
- Final award: 1918
- Ribbon of the order

Precedence
- Next (higher): Order of Albert the Bear

The Order of Merit for Science and Art was established on 30 July 1873 by Duke Friedrich I of Anhalt. It was awarded to acknowledge and reward excellent and outstanding achievements in the field of science and art at home and abroad.

== Order classes ==
First instituted in only one class, the order in 1912 was expanded to include a First Class, Second Class, and Third Class.

== Decoration of the order ==
The badge of the first model from 1873–1905 was a high oval bronze gilt medal, surrounded by twenty-four pointed rays and is suspended by a crown from its ribbon. In the center is the letter F (for Friedrich) in Gothic script and underneath is the semicircular inscription "Herzog von Anhalt" (Duke of Anhalt). On the back is the four-line inscription "Für Wissenschaft und Kunst" (For Science and Art) enclosed in an open top laurel wreath tied at the bottom.

The second model from 1905–1918 was of gold-plated bronze or silver for the third class. The medal instead of being surrounded by rays, it was surrounded by a dense laurel wreath. On the back of was the Anhalt coat of arms in the center encircled by the inscription "Für Wissenschaft und Kunst" (For Science and Art).

Originally, the order was worn suspended from a ribbon on the left chest. After 1905 when the first class was made larger, it was worn from the neck by men and by ladies as a bow on her left shoulder. The second and third class decorations were worn on a ribbon on the left chest. The ribbon was in three equal parts red, dark green and red, similar to the ribbon of the House Order of Albert the Bear.
