= Adelococcaceae =

Scientific classification
- Kingdom: Fungi
- Division: Ascomycota
- Class: Eurotiomycetes
- Order: Verrucariales
- Family: Adelococcaceae; Triebel (1993)

Type genus
- Adelococcus Theiss. & Syd. (1918)

Genera
- Adelococcus; Pseudopyrenidium; Sagediopsis

Family of fungi

The Adelococcaceae are a family of fungi in the order Verrucariales. Species are mostly found in north temperate regions, and are biotrophic or necrotrophic on lichens. The family was proposed by mycologist Dagmar Triebel in 1993.

== Genera ==
- Adelococcus Theiss. & Syd. (1918) – 4 spp.
- Pseudopyrenidium Nav.-Ros., Zhurb. & Cl.Roux (2010) – 2 spp.
- Sagediopsis Sacc. ex Vain. (1921) – 11 spp.
