= Ruggero Tomaselli =

Italian botanist

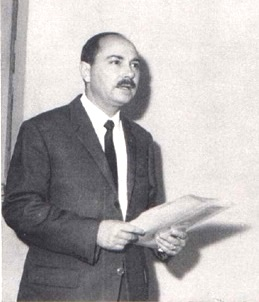
- Born: 22 August 1920; Trento, Italy
- Died: 30 March 1982 (aged 61); Monzuno, Italy
- Scientific career
- Fields: Botany
- Author abbrev. (botany): Tomas.

Ruggero Tomaselli (Trento, 22 August 1920 – Monzuno, 30 March 1982) was an Italian botanist. He introduced the study of phytosociology to Italy.

== Biography ==
Tomaselli was born in Trento on 22 August 1920. In 1943 he graduated from the University of Pavia in Natural Sciences and began his university career as an assistant to the chair of Geology; in 1947 he was appointed assistant of the chair of Botany held by Raffaele Ciferri.

In 1946 he specialized in plant cytology at Sorbonne University and in 1948 he began working at the Station Internationale de Geobotanique Méditerranéenne et Alpine in Montpellier, under the direction of Josias Braun-Blanquet, dedicating himself to the study of phytosociology.

After winning a scholarship at the University of Kansas, where in 1952 he worked with the geographer A. W. Kuchler, he returned to Pavia and began to study the phytogeography of Mediterranean vegetation. From 1959 to 1964 he was prefect of the Botanical Garden of the University of Catania; from 1964 to 1982 he was director of the Institute and the Botanical Garden of Pavia.

Ruggero Tomaselli is credited with having introduced the studies of phytosociology in Italy with his work Introduction to the Study of Phytosociology, published in Milan in 1956. His research has influenced for years the activity of the Institute of Botany of the University of Pavia in the geobotanical and cartographic field: in Pavia he published the first map of the potential natural vegetation of Italy which, together with other notable studies in the phytosociological field, among which he won the presidency of the "Group of experts for the cartography of European vegetation of the Council of Europe". His research in the ecological and vegetational field was utilised in the creation of the bioclimatic map of Italy.

In 1988, the Institute of Botany of the University of Pavia formally purchased his substantial book and cartographic collection (223 containers containing miscellaneous publications, 420 volumes and about 280 phytogeographic papers with frequent original notes by the author) of various topics (phytogeography, cartography, ecology, plant physiology, etc.).

Tomaselli also did some taxonomical work in the area of lichenology. Italian lichenologist Pier Luigi Nimis described him as a "versatile botanist", but without having left any significant contributions to the field. Together with Raffaele Ciferri, Tomaselli published 215 alternative names for the fungal component (the mycobiont) of lichens; most of these ended in the suffix -myces. The vast majority of these names were later determined to be formally illegitimate according to nomenclatural rules.

Tomaselli died prematurely on 30 March 1982 in a road accident while returning from a work trip together with his colleagues Sebastiano Filipello and Mario Sacchi. As part of the XVII International Ethnobotany Symposium in Antigua, Tomaselli was posthumously awarded the Scientific Award for 2019.

== Eponyms ==
Species named after Tomaselli include Tillandsia tomasellii De Luca, Sabato, Balduzzi (Bromeliaceae), and Dioon tomasellii Di Luca, Sabato & Vázq.Torres (Zamiaceae).

== Selected works ==
- Ciferri, R.; Tomaselli, R. (1952). Saggio di una sistematica micolichenologica. Atti Ist. Bot. Pavia serie 5, 10: 25–84
- Ciferri, R.; Tomaselli, R. (1953). Tentative mycolichenes classification. Atti dell'Istituto Botanico della Università e Laboratorio Crittogamico di Pavia, serie 5, 10 (1): 25–84
- Ciferri, R.; Tomaselli, R. (1954). "Reply to Santesson's criticism on taxonomy of fungal symbionts of lichens" (PDF). Taxon. 3 (8): 230–231. JSTOR 216601.
- Ciferri, R.; Tomaselli, R. (1955). Sulla Nomenclatura del fungo simbionte dei licheni. Nuovo Giornale Botanico Italiano, N.S. 62 (3–4): 501–504
- Tomaselli, R.; Ciferri, R. (1954). Scissioni di generi di licheni sulla base delle caratteristiche del fungo. Atti Ist. Bot. Univ. Pavia, serie 5, 12 (1): 30–69
- Ciferri, R.; Tomaselli, R. (1957). Prospetto di una sistematica micolichenologica. Atti Ist. Bot. Univ. Pavia, serie 5, 14 (1-3): 247–262
- Tomaselli, R. (1950). Appunti sulla Sistematica e distribuzione geografica dei basidiolicheni. Archivio Botanico per la Sistematica, Fitogeografia e Genetica 26: 100–116
- Tomaselli, R. (1951). "Notes sur les basidiolichens". Revue Bryologique et Lichénologique. Série 2 (in French). 20 (1–2): 212–214.
- Tomaselli, R. (1957). Modalitá di crescita di vari ceppi Italiani di Xanthoriomyces (fungo lichenizzante). Atti Dell Istituto Botanico dell'Università di Pavia, serie 5, 12 (3–4): 320–359
- Tomaselli, R. (1962). Considerazioni sulla posizione sistemica degli ascomiceti simbionti nei licheni. Atti. Accad. Gioenia, serie 6, 14: 168–199
- Tomaselli, R. (1964). Raffaele Ciferri (1897–1964). Atti Ist. Bot. Univ. Lab. Crittogam. Pavia, serie 5, Supl. 21: 55 pp.

== See also ==
- Category:Taxa named by Ruggero Tomaselli
