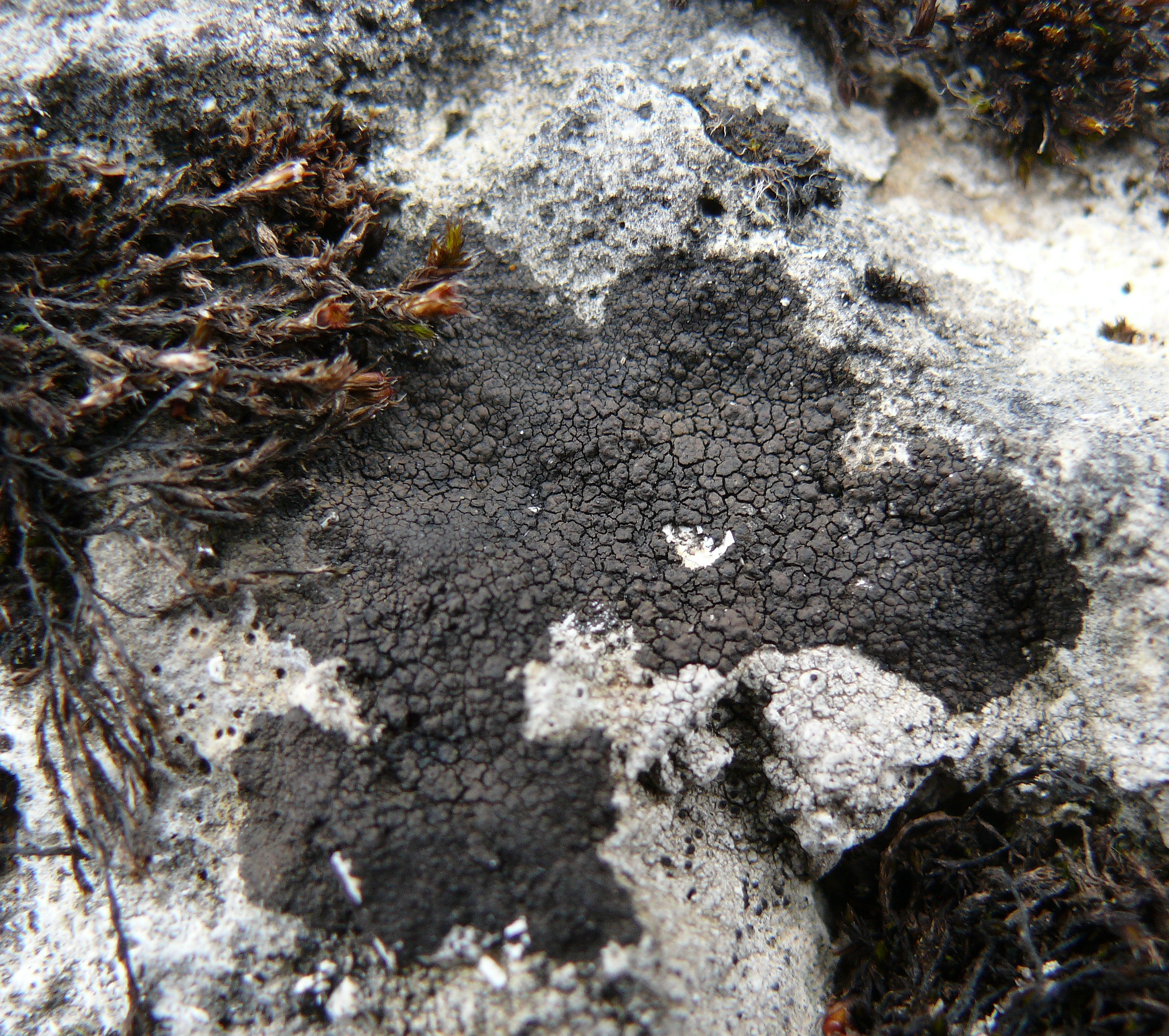
- Verrucaria nigrescens, Schwäbische Alb, Germany

Scientific classification
- Kingdom: Fungi
- Division: Ascomycota
- Class: Eurotiomycetes
- Order: Verrucariales
- Family: Verrucariaceae
- Genus: Verrucaria; Shrad. (1794)

Type species
- Verrucaria rupestris Shrad. (1794)

Species
- about 150 accepted species

Synonyms
- Trimmatothele Norman ex Zahlbr. (1903)

= Verrucaria =

Genus of lichen-forming fungi

Verrucaria is a genus of lichenized (lichen-forming) fungi in the family Verrucariaceae. These lichens form crust-like growths on rocks, particularly limestone and other calcareous surfaces, though some species also grow on siliceous rock or occasionally on bark and soil. The genus includes both terrestrial species found in dry environments and marine species that can survive periodic flooding or permanent submersion in coastal and freshwater habitats. With about 150 accepted species worldwide, Verrucaria represents a challenging taxonomic group due to overlapping physical characteristics and the polyphyletic nature of the genus.

== Taxonomy ==
The genus was circumscribed by German botanist Heinrich Adolph Schrader in 1794, with Verrucaria rupestris assigned as the type species. In his brief diagnosis of the genus, Schrader mentioned the more or less spherical (subglobose), closed ascomata, and the crustose thallus. He included four species in the genus, only one of which (the type) still remains. The genus name is derived from the Latin word verruca (meaning "wart") and the suffix -aria (meaning "belonging to" or "possession").

The genus has proven to be highly polyphyletic, with numerous species described from Europe creating a taxonomically challenging group. Of particular difficulty are species occurring on calcareous rocks that are characterised by pale, thin thalli, large spores (exceeding 25 μm in length), and perithecia that leave distinctive pits in the rock surface. This morphologically similar group, which appears to belong to the so-called Thelidium group based on phylogenetic analysis, has confused taxonomy with many species not reported since their original descriptions and others treated as dubious names. Molecular and morphological studies have revealed that whilst these species show considerable overlap in their physical characteristics and low genetic variation, they represent distinct taxa that are often difficult to identify based on morphology alone. The continuing discovery of new species—including seven described from Finland alone in 2020—suggests that the diversity within this genus remains underexplored, particularly in northern Europe where fewer species have been historically described compared to Central and Southern Europe.

== Description ==
Verrucaria forms a crust-like (crustose) thallus that either lies flush with its substrate or sits slightly on top of it. The surface can be continuous, cracked into plates (areolate), or covered with granular warts, and in some species it produces minute vegetative fragments such as blastidia, isidia, or soredia that break off to start new colonies. Thalli vary in colour from white, green, or grey to various shades of brown and black, sometimes framed by a white-to-black sterile margin (a prothallus). The upper cortex—the protective skin—is variable: it may be absent, poorly organised into a pseudocortex, or well developed as a true cortex (eucortex) or a lithocortex hardened with mineral grains; its topmost cells are often pigmented. Beneath this, the algal partner may be evenly scattered, arranged in vertical columns, or clustered in patches, while the medulla (the inner fungal layer) can be missing altogether or present as a tightly or loosely woven tissue, sometimes capped by a black basal band.

Sexual reproduction occurs in small, usually black, flask-shaped perithecia that are sunken in the thallus or protrude to varying degrees, occasionally pitting the rock below. Each perithecium typically carries an involucrellum—an extra dark wall—that envelops the paler excipulum. Inside, the colourless hymenium reacts with iodine: the gel between the spore-bearing cells stains red in strong Lugol's iodine and blue in a weaker test that follows potassium hydroxide solution pretreatment. True paraphyses are absent; instead, tiny sterile threads (periphyses and periphysoids) line the neck and upper chamber. The asci have a double wall that splits when the spores are released (fissitunicate), contain eight ascospores (four in V. madida), and do not stain with Lugol's iodine. Ascospores are single-celled, colourless, broadly to narrowly ellipsoid or oblong, with a smooth surface and sometimes surrounded by a clear halo. Asexual reproduction takes place in immersed pycnidia that generate simple, rod-shaped conidia.

== Ecology ==
Most Verrucaria species colonise calcareous or siliceous rock, only occasionally appearing on bark or soil. They grow in dry settings or in places that are periodically flooded or submerged, and they are found in both coastal and freshwater environments.

As of 2015, there were 16 Verrucaria species classified as marine species: V. adguttata, V. allantoidea, V. ceuthocarpa, V. corallensi, V. ditmarsica, V. erichsenii, V. halizoa, V. halochlora, V. microsporoides, V. paulula, V. psychrophila, V. sandstedei, V. serpuloides, V. sessilis, V. subdiscreta, and V. thalassina.

== Species ==
- Verrucaria ahtii – Finland
- Verrucaria kiyosumiensis – Japan
- Verrucaria nigrescens – widespread
- Verrucaria oulankaensis – Finland
- Verrucaria rhizicola – France
- Verrucaria rupestris
- Verrucaria serpuloides – a permanently submerged marine lichen in Antarctica
- Verrucaria takagoensis – Japan
- Verrucaria vitikainenii – Finland

== Distribution ==
Verrucaria ditmarsica has been recorded in 1984 from the Lighthouse Island, Copeland Island, County Down, Northern Ireland.

== See also ==
- Hydropunctaria maura, formerly Verrucaria maura, one of the most widespread lichens on the European littoral zone and found worldwide
