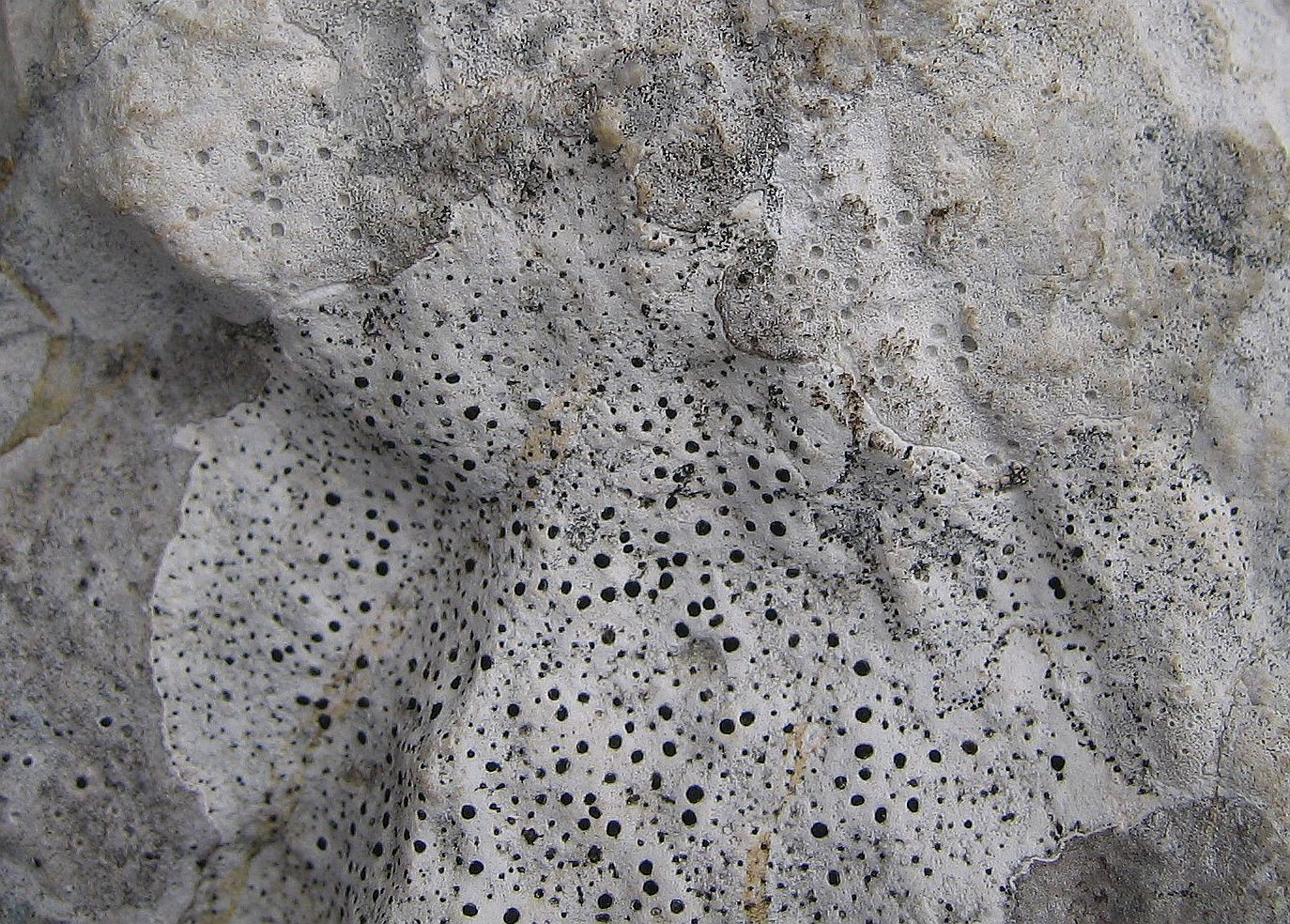
- Unidentified specimen of Verrucaria

Scientific classification
- Domain: Eukaryota
- Kingdom: Fungi
- Division: Ascomycota
- Class: Eurotiomycetes
- Subclass: Chaetothyriomycetidae
- Order: Verrucariales; Mattick ex D.Hawksw. & O.E.Erikss. (1986)

Families
- Adelococcaceae; Sarcopyreniaceae; Verrucariaceae

= Verrucariales =

Order of fungi

Verrucariales is an order of ascomycetous fungi within the subclass Chaetothyriomycetidae of the class Eurotiomycetes. Although most of the Verrucariales are lichenised, the family Sarcopyreniaceae consists of 11 species of lichenicolous (lichen-dwelling) fungi.

Phylogenomic analysis suggests that the divergence between the lichenised Verrucariales and nonlichenised Chaetothyriales occurred about 131 million years ago.

== Description ==
Members of the Verrucariales are primarily organisms that form symbiotic relationships with algae or cyanobacteria, creating lichens. These lichens are remarkable for their ability to thrive in a wide range of environments, from extremely dry land habitats to freshwater and even marine ecosystems, where they are particularly abundant. A significant portion of Verrucariales species can be found growing on rocks, especially in temperate climates. Some fungi in this order have evolved to become parasites, either living independently or forming lichens themselves while feeding on other lichens.

The physical structure (thallus) of Verrucariales lichens varies greatly in both form and colour. Many species contain melanin, a dark pigment also found in human skin, which is a characteristic shared with another fungal order called Chaetothyriales. Unlike many other lichens, Verrucariales rarely produce specialised structures for asexual reproduction, such as isidia (small, coral-like outgrowths) or soredia (powdery clusters of fungal cells wrapped around algal cells).

For sexual reproduction, these fungi typically develop flask-shaped structures called perithecia, which may be embedded within the lichen body or grow on its surface. These perithecia have small openings (ostioles) through which spores are released. The spores are produced in sac-like structures called asci, which have a double wall. When mature, these asci either split open or dissolve to release the spores. At maturity, the reproductive structures of Verrucariales lack certain sterile tissues (called interascal elements) that are present in many other fungi, a feature they share with the order Chaetothyriales.

== Genera of uncertain placement ==
There are some genera in the Verrucariales that have not been placed with certainty into any family. These are:

- Botryolepraria Canals, Hern.-Mar., Gómez-Bolea & Llimona (1997) – 2 spp.
- Gemmaspora D.Hawksw. & Halici (2007) – 1 sp.
- Kalbiana Henssen (1998) – 1 sp.
- Merismatium Zopf (1898) – 10 spp.
