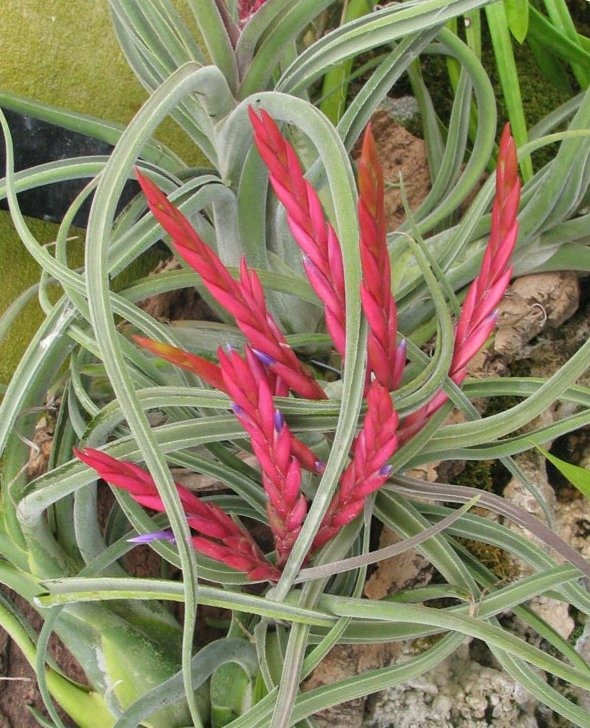

Scientific classification
- Kingdom: Plantae
- Clade: Tracheophytes
- Clade: Angiosperms
- Clade: Monocots
- Clade: Commelinids
- Order: Poales
- Family: Bromeliaceae
- Genus: Tillandsia
- Subgenus: Tillandsia subg. Tillandsia
- Species: T. caput-medusae

Binomial name
- Tillandsia caput-medusae E.Morren

= Tillandsia caput-medusae =

Species of flowering plant

Tillandsia caput-medusae is a species of flowering plant in the bromeliad family, Bromeliaceae, subfamily Tillandsioideae. Common names include octopus plant and medusa's head. An epiphyte native to Central America and Mexico, T. caput-medusae is a commonly cultivated bromeliad species. The thick, channeled, tapering and twisting leaves are up to 25 cm (9.8 in) long and are covered in fine gray hairs. The rosette of leaves arise from an inflated pseudobulb. Pups are produced after blooming, as is usual with most Tillandsia species.

In a greenhouse, the plants can bloom from spring to early summer. The red inflorescences are usually unbranched or digitate. Bright violet flowers are about 3.2 cm (1.3 in) long with the stamens exerted.

Tillandsia caput-medusae does not have any free water retention in its overlapping leaves because its abaxial and adaxial leaf bases provides trichomes which coats the leaves. The significance of trichome is to enhance leaf permeability.

== Cultivars ==
- Tillandsia 'Bruce Aldridge' (T. caput-medusae × T. schiedeana)
- Tillandsia 'Calum' (T. caput-medusae × T. brachycaulos)
- Tillandsia 'Canina' (T. bulbosa × T. caput-medusae)
- Tillandsia 'Cheryl' (T. caput-medusae × T. capitata 'Peach')
- Tillandsia 'Como' (T. streptophylla × T. caput-medusae)
- Tillandsia 'Gunalda' (T. concolor × T. caput-medusae)
- Tillandsia 'Imbil' (T. brachycaulos × T. caput-medusae)
- Tillandsia 'June Bug' (T. caput-medusae × T. bulbosa)
- Tillandsia 'Litl Liz' (T. caput-medusae × T. streptophylla)
- Tillandsia 'Panuco' (T. caput-medusae × T. durangensis)
- Tillandsia 'Pomona' (T. caput-medusae × T. ionantha)
- Tillandsia 'Red Slippers' (T. ionantha var. van-hyningii × T. caput-medusae 'Red form')
- Tillandsia 'Sonoran Snow'
- Tillandsia 'Veronica Orozco' (T. baileyi × T. caput-medusae)
- Tillandsia 'Vicente Bacaya' (T. capitata × T. caput-medusae)
