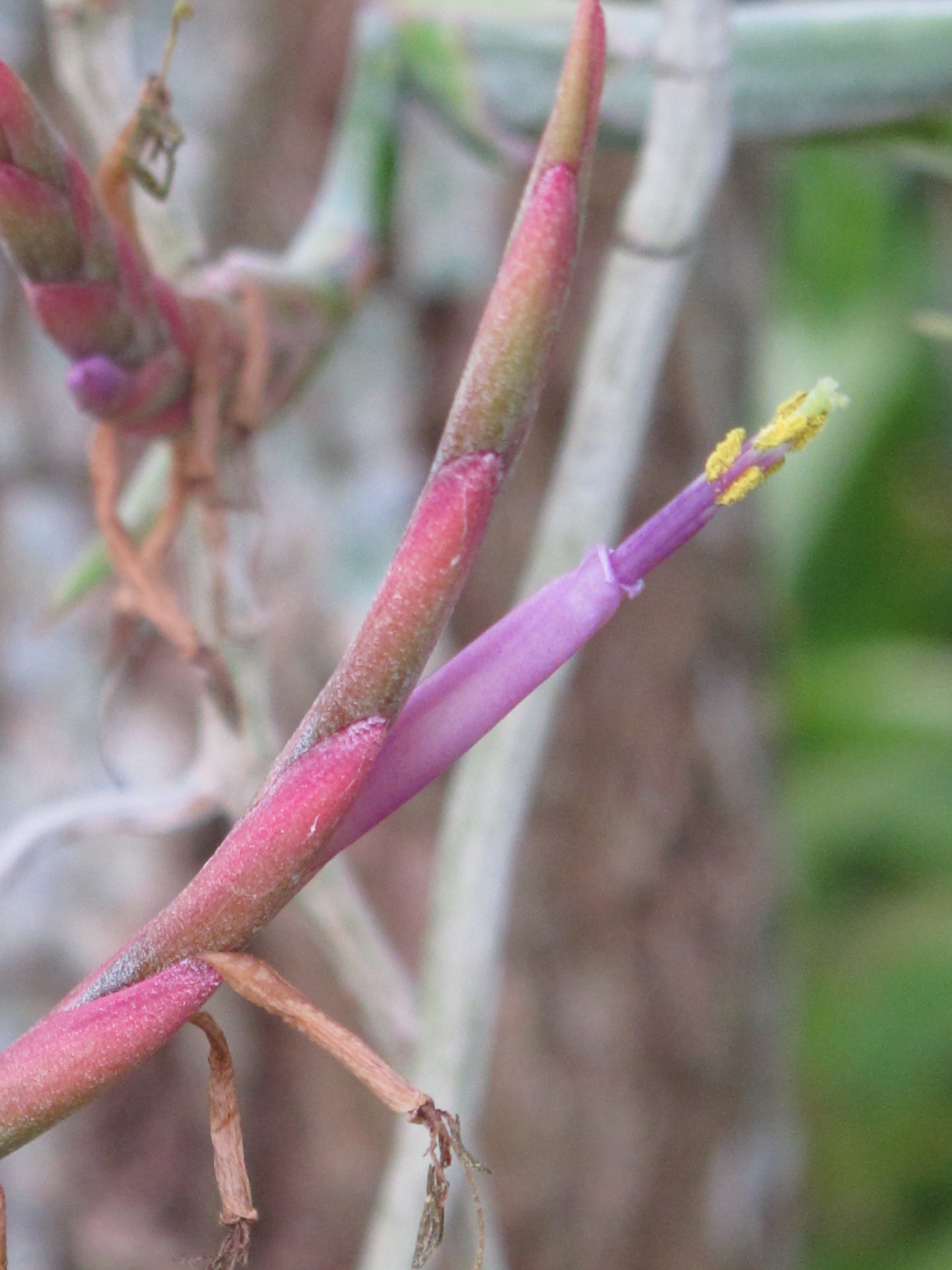

Scientific classification
- Kingdom: Plantae
- Clade: Embryophytes
- Clade: Tracheophytes
- Clade: Spermatophytes
- Clade: Angiosperms
- Clade: Monocots
- Clade: Commelinids
- Order: Poales
- Family: Bromeliaceae
- Genus: Tillandsia
- Subgenus: Tillandsia subg. Tillandsia
- Species: T. intermedia

Binomial name
- Tillandsia intermedia Mez

Synonyms
- Tillandsia paucifolia subsp. schubertii F.Ebel & J.Röth

= Tillandsia intermedia =

Species of flowering plant

Tillandsia intermedia is a species of flowering plant in the family Bromeliaceae. The species is endemic to western Mexico, reported from Guerrero, Sinaloa, and Jalisco.

== Cultivars ==
Recognized cultivars include:

- Tillandsia 'Curly Slim' (T. intermedia × T. streptophylla)
- Tillandsia 'Dimmitt's Delight'
- Tillandsia 'Kanyan' (T. intermedia × T. baileyi)
- Tillandsia 'KimThoa Aldridge' (T. intermedia × T. concolor)
- Tillandsia 'Long John' (T. pseudobaileyi × T. intermedia)
- Tillandsia 'Mudlo' (T. intermedia × T. ionantha)
- Tillandsia 'Victory' (T. intermedia × T. capitata)
