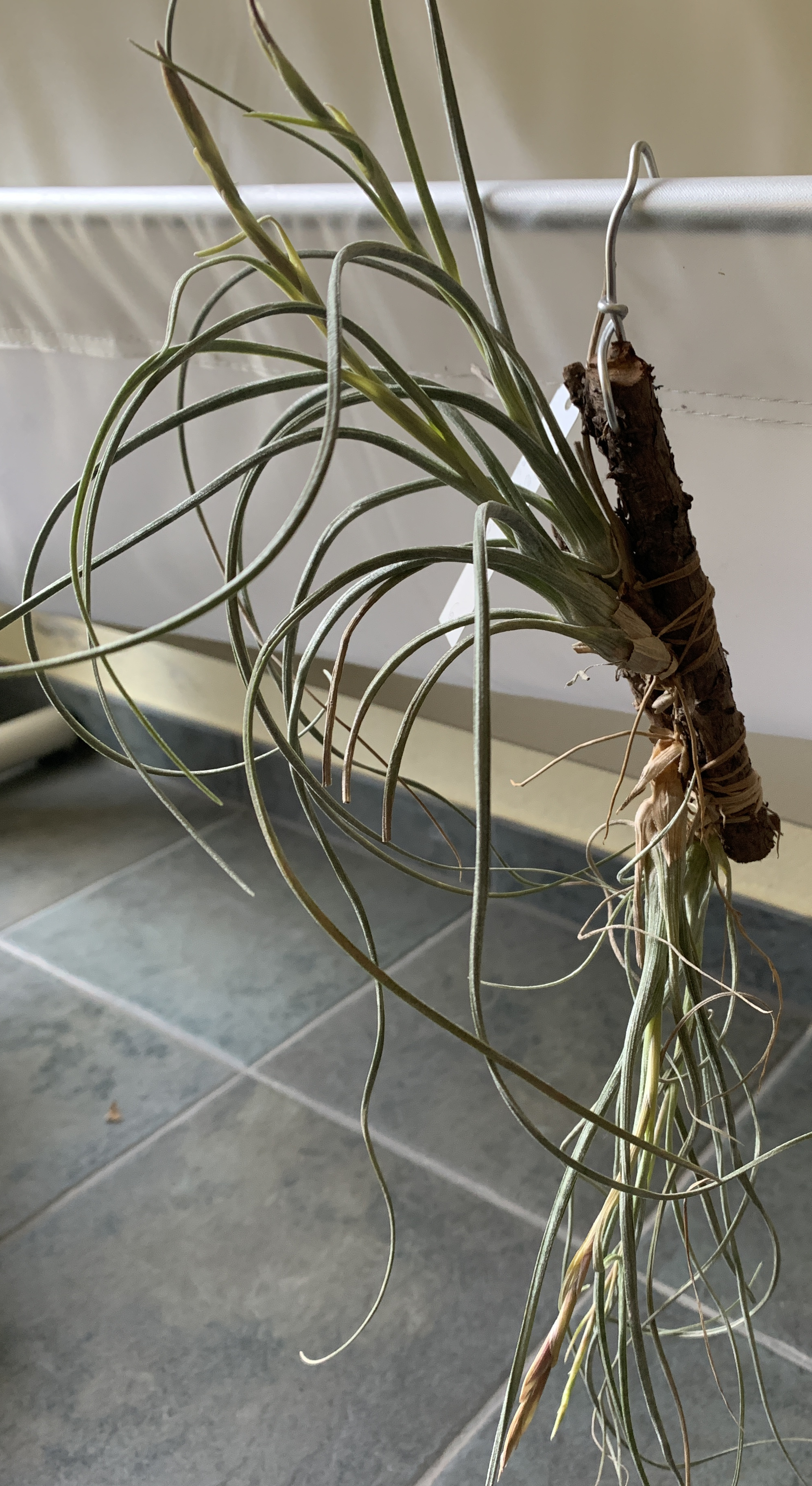

Conservation status
- Imperiled (NatureServe)

Scientific classification
- Kingdom: Plantae
- Clade: Tracheophytes
- Clade: Angiosperms
- Clade: Monocots
- Clade: Commelinids
- Order: Poales
- Family: Bromeliaceae
- Genus: Tillandsia
- Subgenus: Tillandsia subg. Tillandsia
- Species: T. baileyi

Binomial name
- Tillandsia baileyi Rose ex Small

= Tillandsia baileyi =

Species of flowering plant

Tillandsia baileyi, commonly known as the reflexed airplant or Bailey's ball moss, is a species of bromeliad that is native to southern Texas in the United States and Tamaulipas in Mexico. It is found along the Gulf of Mexico from Kingsville, Texas to Tampico, Tamaulipas. Preferred host plants for this epiphyte include southern live oak (Quercus virginiana) and Texas ebony (Ebenopsis ebano).

== Cultivars ==
- Tillandsia 'Borumba' (T. baileyi 'Texas' × T. 'Druid')
- Tillandsia 'Califano' (T. baileyi × T. ionantha)
- Tillandsia 'Festubail' (T. festucoides × T. baileyi)
- Tillandsia 'Halley's Comet'
- Tillandsia 'Kanyan' (T. intermedia × T. baileyi)
- Tillandsia 'Mark Aldridge' (T. baileyi × T. capitata 'Maroon')
- Tillandsia 'Rosalie Mavrikas' (T. baileyi × T. schiediana)
- Tillandsia 'Tiaro' (T. baileyi × T. seleriana)
- Tillandsia 'Veronica Orozco' (T. baileyi × T. caput-medusae)
- Tillandsia 'Wallu' (T. baileyi × T. achyrostachys?)

== See also ==
- Vernon Orlando Bailey
