= Tillandsia × jaguactalensis =

Scientific classification
- Kingdom: Plantae
- Clade: Embryophytes
- Clade: Tracheophytes
- Clade: Angiosperms
- Clade: Monocots
- Clade: Commelinids
- Order: Poales
- Family: Bromeliaceae
- Genus: Tillandsia
- Subgenus: Tillandsia subg. Tillandsia
- Species: T. × jaguactalensis

Binomial name
- Tillandsia × jaguactalensis I.Ramírez, Carnevali & Chi

Hybrid plant endemic to Mexico

Tillandsia × jaguactalensis is a natural hybrid (T. brachycaulos × T. streptophylla) of the genus Tillandsia. This plant is endemic to Mexico.
