= Tillandsia festucoides =

Scientific classification
- Kingdom: Plantae
- Clade: Tracheophytes
- Clade: Angiosperms
- Clade: Monocots
- Clade: Commelinids
- Order: Poales
- Family: Bromeliaceae
- Genus: Tillandsia
- Subgenus: Tillandsia subg. Tillandsia
- Species: T. festucoides

Binomial name
- Tillandsia festucoides Brongn. ex Mez

Synonyms
- Tillandsia caricifolia E.Morren ex Mez

Species of flowering plant

Tillandsia festucoides, commonly known as the fescue airplant, is a species of bromeliad that is native to the Greater Antilles, Mexico, the Cayman Islands, and Central America.

== Cultivars ==
- Tillandsia 'Festubail' (T. festucoides × T. baileyi)
