= Tillandsia pseudobaileyi subsp. yucatanensis =

Scientific classification
- Kingdom: Plantae
- Clade: Tracheophytes
- Clade: Angiosperms
- Clade: Monocots
- Clade: Commelinids
- Order: Poales
- Family: Bromeliaceae
- Genus: Tillandsia
- Species: T. pseudobaileyi
- Subspecies: T. p. subsp. yucatanensis

Trinomial name
- Tillandsia pseudobaileyi subsp. yucatanensis I. Ramírez, Carnevali & Olmsted

Subspecies of plant

Tillandsia pseudobaileyi subsp. yucatanensis is a subspecies of flowering plant in the genus Tillandsia. This subspecies is endemic to Mexico.
