= Tillandsia pseudobaileyi =

Scientific classification
- Kingdom: Plantae
- Clade: Tracheophytes
- Clade: Angiosperms
- Clade: Monocots
- Clade: Commelinids
- Order: Poales
- Family: Bromeliaceae
- Genus: Tillandsia
- Subgenus: Tillandsia subg. Tillandsia
- Species: T. pseudobaileyi

Binomial name
- Tillandsia pseudobaileyi Gardner

Species of plant

Tillandsia pseudobaileyi is a species of flowering plant in the genus Tillandsia. This species is native to Mexico, Guatemala, El Salvador, Honduras, and Nicaragua.

Two varieties are recognized:

- Tillandsia pseudobaileyi subsp. pseudobaileyi – Central America; Mexico from Chiapas north to Veracruz and Nayarit
- Tillandsia pseudobaileyi subsp. yucatanensis I.Ramírez – Yucatán Peninsula

== Cultivars ==
- Tillandsia 'Gorgon'
- Tillandsia 'Long John'
- Tillandsia 'Mark Goddard'
- Tillandsia 'Pink Chiffon'
