= Tillandsia achyrostachys =

Scientific classification
- Kingdom: Plantae
- Clade: Tracheophytes
- Clade: Angiosperms
- Clade: Monocots
- Clade: Commelinids
- Order: Poales
- Family: Bromeliaceae
- Genus: Tillandsia
- Subgenus: Tillandsia subg. Tillandsia
- Species: T. achyrostachys

Binomial name
- Tillandsia achyrostachys E.Morren ex Baker

Species of plant

Tillandsia achyrostachys (Morren and Baker, 1889) is a perennial plant in the genus Tillandsia.

The name straw-eared refers to the wrinkled cover leaves.

== Description ==
The plant is stemless, 40 cm high with a flower stalk, and the leaves form an erect rosette.

The leaf bases are oblong-ovate, 2–3 cm wide, 4–6 cm long, and gray scaly in colour.

The leaves are erect, slightly curved at the top, narrow lanceolate in shape, measuring 20 cm long and 2 cm wide above the base.

The flower stalk is upright, bare, 15 cm long, and 3 to 5 mm wide.

The inflorescence is a simple ear, flattened on both sides, ranging from 15 to 20 cm long and 2 cm wide.

The cover leaves are densely potted, oval, pointed, 4 cm long, 2 cm wide, membranous, and ashy, red or greenish red.

The flowers are upright, indoors, 4–6 cm long, and green, with protruding anthers. The petals form a narrow tube, 4 cm long. The cup leaves are lanceolate, long, and pointed.

It is reminiscent of a small T. califann in a flowering state.

== Distribution ==
Mexico, up to 2000 m.

== Treatment ==
The plant prefers moderate water but not too dry, light shade.

== Cultivars ==
- Tillandsia 'Key Lime Sundae'
- Tillandsia 'Pink Chiffon'
