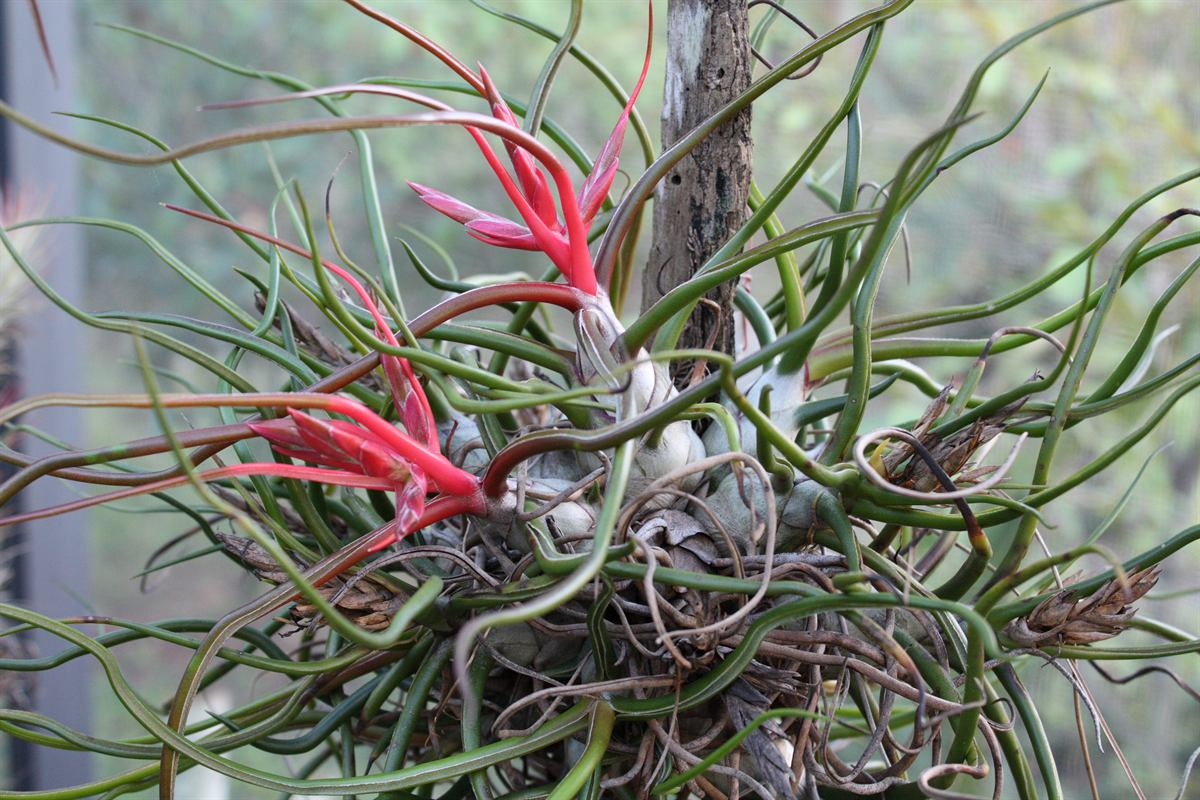

Scientific classification
- Kingdom: Plantae
- Clade: Tracheophytes
- Clade: Angiosperms
- Clade: Monocots
- Clade: Commelinids
- Order: Poales
- Family: Bromeliaceae
- Genus: Tillandsia
- Subgenus: Tillandsia subg. Tillandsia
- Species: T. bulbosa

Binomial name
- Tillandsia bulbosa Hook.

Synonyms
- Platystachys bulbosa (Hook.) Beer; Tillandsia bulbosa var. brasiliensis Schult. & Schult.f.; Tillandsia bulbosa var. picta Hook.; Tillandsia erythraea Lindl. & Paxton; Tillandsia pumila Lindl. & Paxton; Platystachys erythraea (Lindl. & Paxton) Beer; Tillandsia bulbosa f. alba Takiz.; Tillandsia pumila Griseb. 1865, illegitimate homonym, not Lindl. & Paxton 1850

= Tillandsia bulbosa =

Species of plant

Tillandsia bulbosa, the bulbous airplant, is a species of flowering plant in the genus Tillandsia. It is widespread across Central America, the West Indies, southern Mexico (Chiapas, Tabasco, Veracruz, Yucatán Peninsula), and northern and eastern South America (Venezuela, Colombia, the Guianas, Bahia, Espírito Santo, Alagoas, Amapá, Pernambuco).

== Cultivars ==
- Tillandsia 'Canina'
- Tillandsia 'Chanza'
- Tillandsia 'First Born'
- Tillandsia 'Hyde's Silver'
- Tillandsia 'Joel'
- Tillandsia 'June Bug'
- Tillandsia 'Kacey'
- Tillandsia 'Mark Goddard'
- Tillandsia 'Rechoncho'
- Tillandsia 'Royal Sceptre'
- Tillandsia 'Showtime'
- Tillandsia 'Timm's Twister'
- |Tillandsia 'Veteran'
