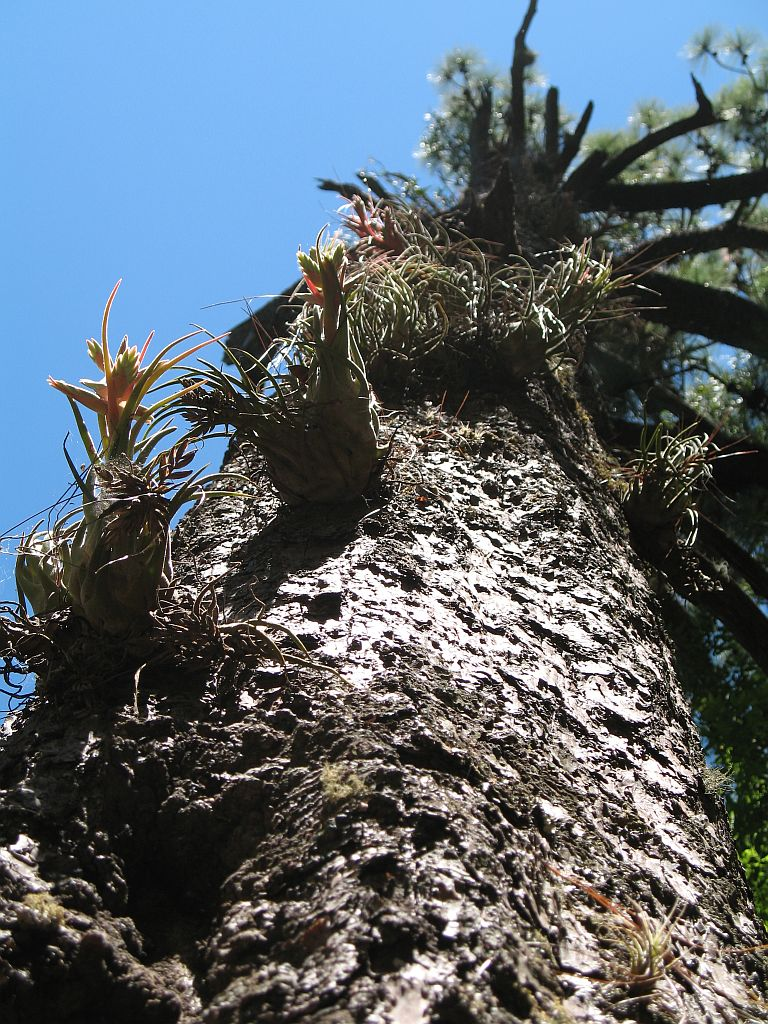

Scientific classification
- Kingdom: Plantae
- Clade: Embryophytes
- Clade: Tracheophytes
- Clade: Angiosperms
- Clade: Monocots
- Clade: Commelinids
- Order: Poales
- Family: Bromeliaceae
- Genus: Tillandsia
- Subgenus: Tillandsia subg. Tillandsia
- Species: T. seleriana

Binomial name
- Tillandsia seleriana Mez

Synonyms
- Heterotypic Synonyms: Tillandsia ehlersiana Rauh

= Tillandsia seleriana =

Species of flowering plant

Tillandsia seleriana is a species of flowering plant in the family Bromeliaceae. This species is native to southern Mexico and Central America.

== Cultivars ==
Recognized cultivars include:

- Tillandsia 'Anwyl Ecstasy'
- Tillandsia 'Anwyl Ecstasy #25'
- Tillandsia 'Glenorchy'
- Tillandsia 'Kia Ora'
- Tillandsia 'Peewee'
- Tillandsia 'Purple Passion'
- Tillandsia 'Selerepton'
- Tillandsia 'Squatty Body'
- Tillandsia 'Tiaro'
- Tillandsia 'Tina Parr'

== Gallery ==
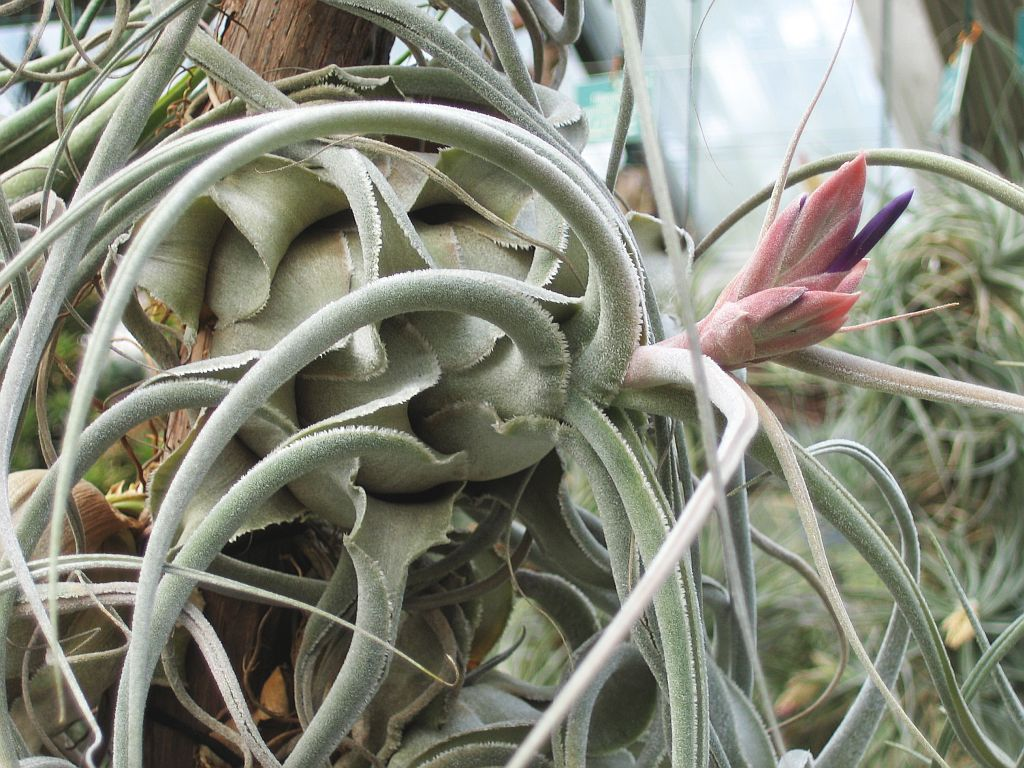
Tillandsia ehlersiana in cultivation at the Botanical Garden of Linz, Austria

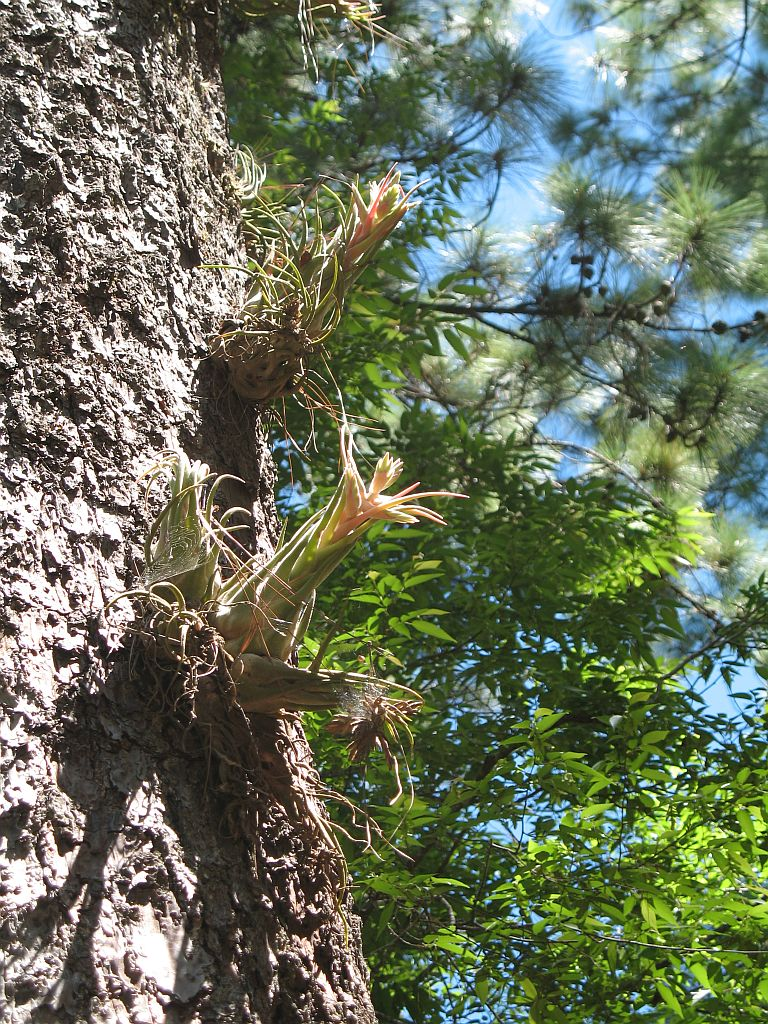
Tillandsia seleriana in habitat in El Salvador, Santa Ana, Montecristo National Park
