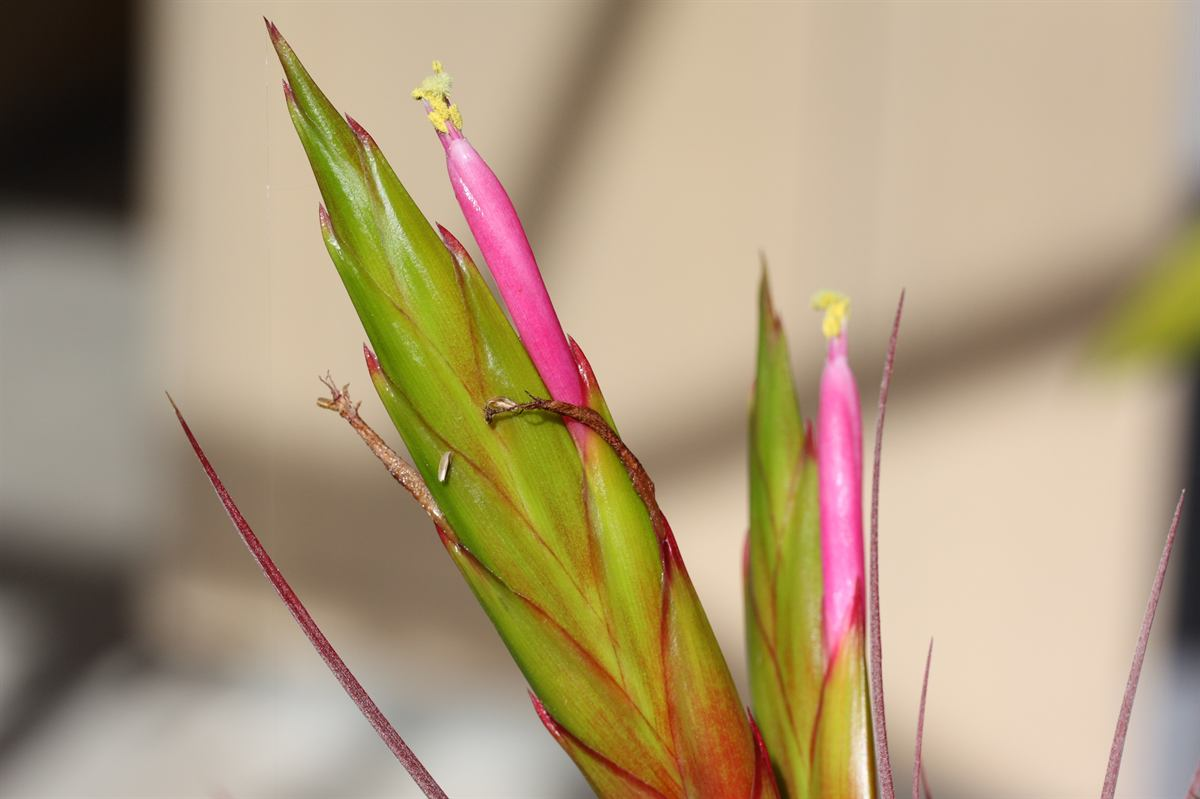

Scientific classification
- Kingdom: Plantae
- Clade: Tracheophytes
- Clade: Angiosperms
- Clade: Monocots
- Clade: Commelinids
- Order: Poales
- Family: Bromeliaceae
- Genus: Tillandsia
- Subgenus: Tillandsia subg. Tillandsia
- Species: T. concolor

Binomial name
- Tillandsia concolor L.B.Sm.

= Tillandsia concolor =

Species of plant

Tillandsia concolor is a species of flowering plant in the genus Tillandsia. This species is endemic to Mexico.

== Cultivars ==
- Tillandsia 'Billy Boy'
- Tillandsia 'Comet'
- Tillandsia 'Cooloola'
- Tillandsia 'Cuicatlan'
- Tillandsia 'Curra'
- Tillandsia 'Diana'
- Tillandsia 'Elisa'
- Tillandsia 'Gunalda'
- Tillandsia 'Hilda Arriza'
- Tillandsia 'Impression Perfection'
- Tillandsia 'Jackie Loinaz'
- Tillandsia 'KimThoa Aldridge'
- Tillandsia 'Perfectly Peachy'
- Tillandsia 'Phoenix'
- Tillandsia 'PJ's Prize'
- Tillandsia 'Redy'
- Tillandsia 'Toolara'
- Tillandsia 'Widgee'
