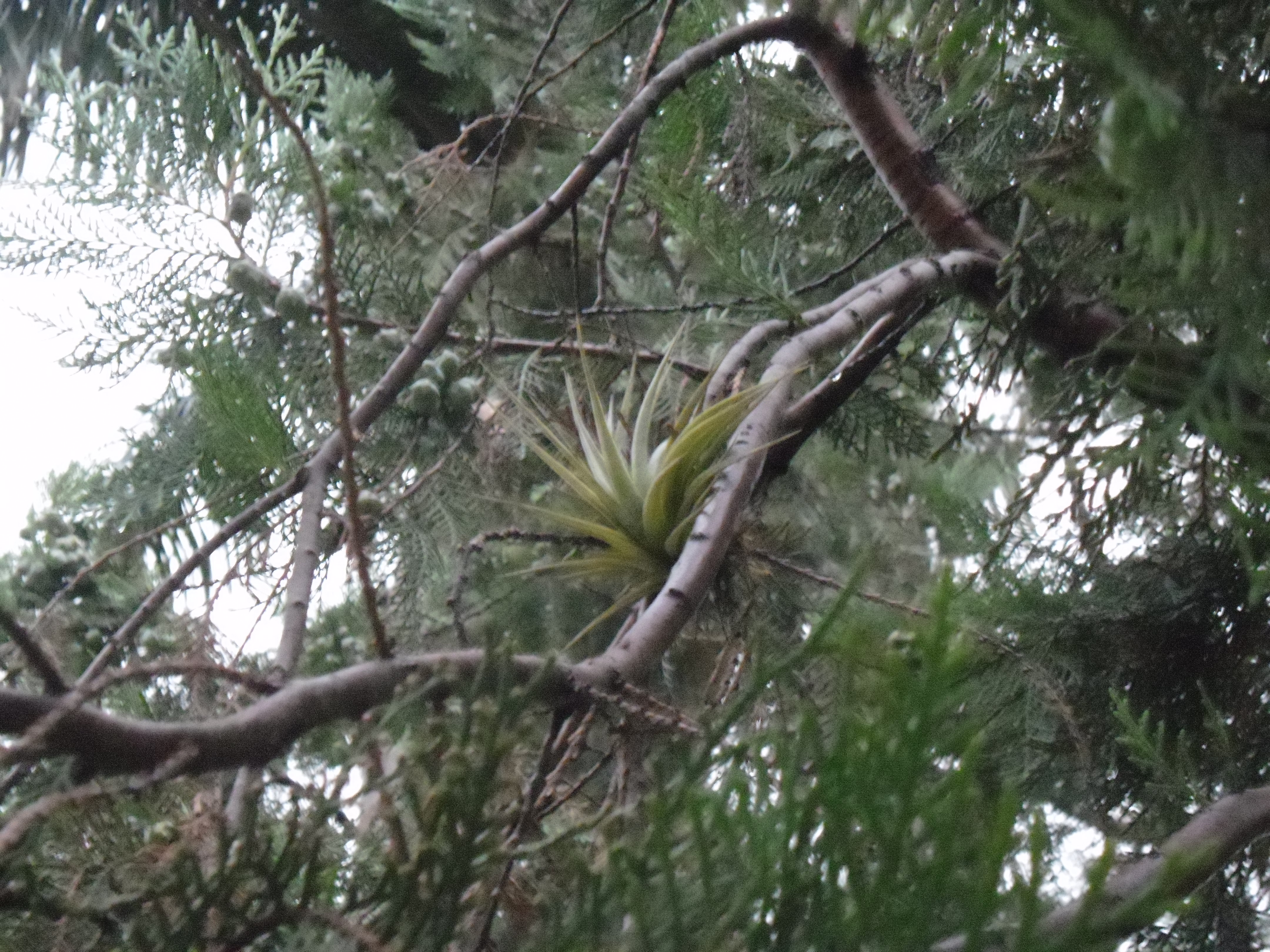
- Tillandsia brachycaulos stuck to a cypress

Conservation status
- Least Concern (IUCN 3.1)

Scientific classification
- Kingdom: Plantae
- Clade: Tracheophytes
- Clade: Angiosperms
- Clade: Monocots
- Clade: Commelinids
- Order: Poales
- Family: Bromeliaceae
- Genus: Tillandsia
- Subgenus: Tillandsia subg. Tillandsia
- Species: T. brachycaulos

Binomial name
- Tillandsia brachycaulos Schlechtendal

Synonyms
- Tillandsia cryptantha Baker; Tillandsia bradeana Mez & Tonduz; Tillandsia flammea Mez

= Tillandsia brachycaulos =

Species of flowering plant

Tillandsia brachycaulos is a species of flowering plant in the genus Tillandsia. It is native to Mexico, Central America, and Venezuela.

== Cultivars ==
Cultivars include:

- Tillandsia 'Ask Harry'
- Tillandsia 'Betty'
- Tillandsia 'Calum'
- Tillandsia 'Eric Knobloch'
- Tillandsia 'Heather's Blush'
- Tillandsia 'Imbil'
- Tillandsia 'Laurie'
- Tillandsia 'Maria Teresa L.'
- Tillandsia 'Nashville'
- Tillandsia 'Neerdie'
- Tillandsia 'Richard Oeser'
- Tillandsia 'Rongo'
- Tillandsia 'Roy'
- Tillandsia 'Victoria'
- Tillandsia 'Widgee'
- Tillandsia 'Wolvi'
- Tillandsia 'Yabba'
