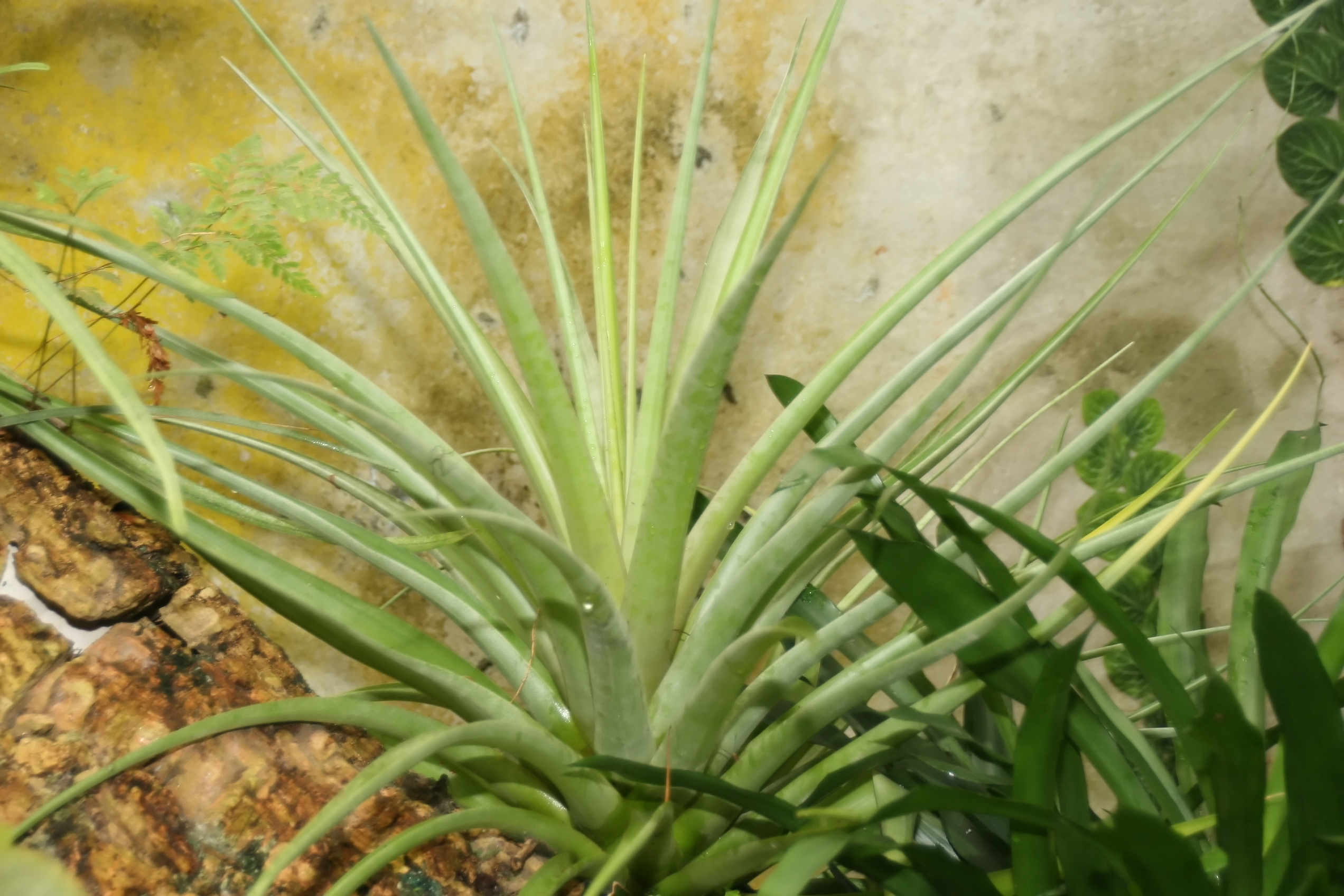

Conservation status
- Least Concern (IUCN 3.1)

Scientific classification
- Kingdom: Plantae
- Clade: Tracheophytes
- Clade: Angiosperms
- Clade: Monocots
- Clade: Commelinids
- Order: Poales
- Family: Bromeliaceae
- Genus: Tillandsia
- Subgenus: Tillandsia subg. Tillandsia
- Species: T. capitata

Binomial name
- Tillandsia capitata Griseb.

Synonyms
- Tillandsia tephrophylla Harms

= Tillandsia capitata =

Species of plant

Tillandsia capitata is a species of flowering plant in the family Bromeliaceae. It is native to Mexico, Honduras, Cuba and the Dominican Republic.

== Cultivars ==
- Tillandsia 'Bacchus'
- Tillandsia 'Lorenzo'
- Tillandsia 'Love Knot'
- Tillandsia 'Marron'
- Tillandsia 'Maya'
- Tillandsia 'Old Gold'
- Tillandsia 'Pink Velvet'
- Tillandsia 'Red Fountain'
- Tillandsia 'Rio Hondo'
- Tillandsia 'Vicente Bacaya'
