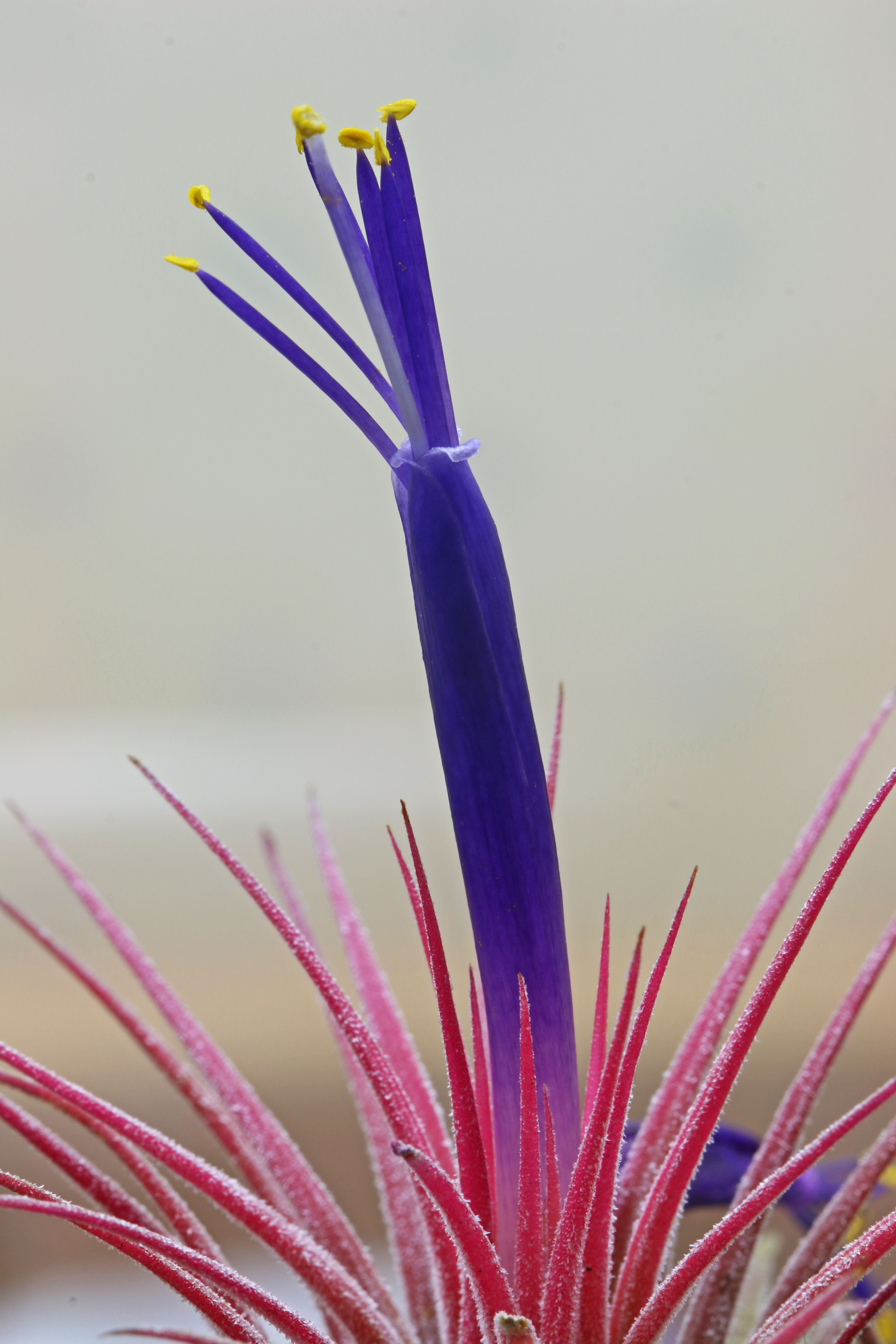

Scientific classification
- Kingdom: Plantae
- Clade: Tracheophytes
- Clade: Angiosperms
- Clade: Monocots
- Clade: Commelinids
- Order: Poales
- Family: Bromeliaceae
- Genus: Tillandsia
- Subgenus: Tillandsia subg. Tillandsia
- Species: T. ionantha

Binomial name
- Tillandsia ionantha Planchon

Synonyms
- Pityrophyllum gracile Beer; Tillandsia rubentifolia Poiss. & Menet

= Tillandsia ionantha =

Species of plant

Tillandsia ionantha, the air plant (a common name shared by most species in its genus), is a species of plant in the genus Tillandsia. This species is native to Central America and Mexico. It is also reportedly naturalized in Broward County, Florida, United States.

== Description ==
They are acaulescent or sometimes shortly caulescent plants, with a size of 6–8 cm high. The leaves are 4–9 cm long; with pods 0.6–1 cm wide, densely patent fabric; narrow triangular sheets, 0.3–0.4 cm wide, dense lepidota indument, foliaceous bracts; compound inflorescence (of simple appearance due to the reduction of the spikes to 1 flower), with 1–3 flowers, primary foliaceous bracts, much longer than the spikes, floral bracts 3 cm long, longer than the sepals and covering them in the anthesis, ecarinated, inconspicuously nervate, glabrous, membranous, sessile flowers; sepals are 2 cm long, free, the posterior carinate, the anterior ecarinated; purple petals. Capsules are 2.5–4.5 cm long.

== Taxonomy ==
Tillandsia ionantha was described by Jules Emile Planchon and published in Flore des Serres et des Jardins de l'Europe 10: 101, t. 1006. 1854–1855 [1855].

== Etymology ==
- Tillandsia: generic name that was named by Carl Linnaeus in 1738 in honor of the Finnish doctor and botanist Elias Tillandz (originally Tillander; 1640–1693).
- ionantha: epithet Latin meaning "with violet flowers"

=== Synonymy ===
- Tillandsia ionantha f. fastigiata P.Koide
- Tillandsia ionantha var. Max Ehlers
- Tillandsia ionantha var. scaposa LBSmith
- Tillandsia ionantha var. stricta P.Koide
- Tillandsia ionantha var. van-hyningii MBFoster
- Tillandsia ionantha var. zebrina BTFoster
- Tillandsia rubentifolia Poisson & Menet
- Tillandsia scopus Hook. F. 4

=== Varieties ===
Two varieties are recognized:

1. Tillandsia ionantha var. ionantha – most of species range
2. Tillandsia ionantha var. stricta Koide – Oaxaca

== Gallery ==
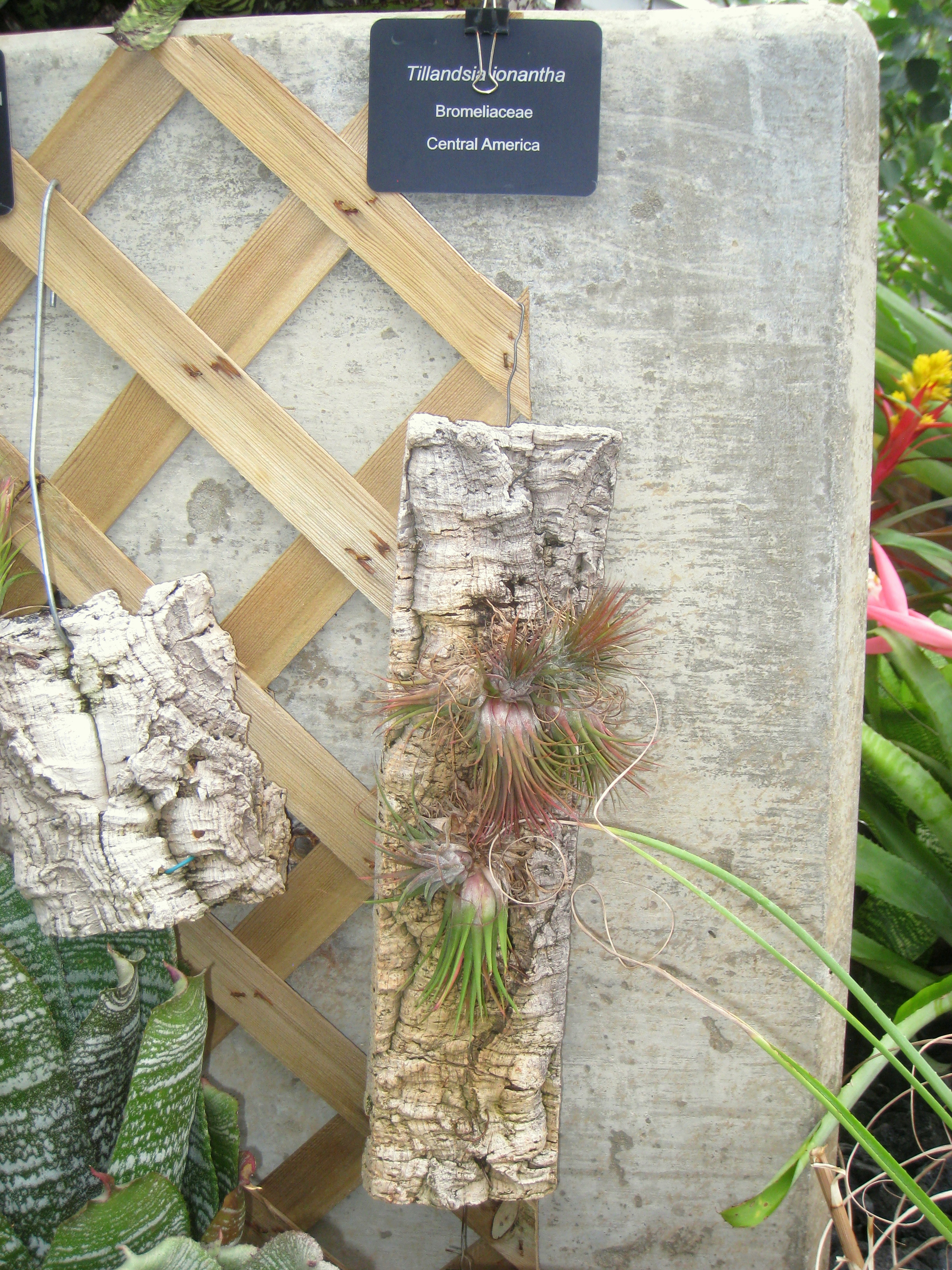
A plant in display

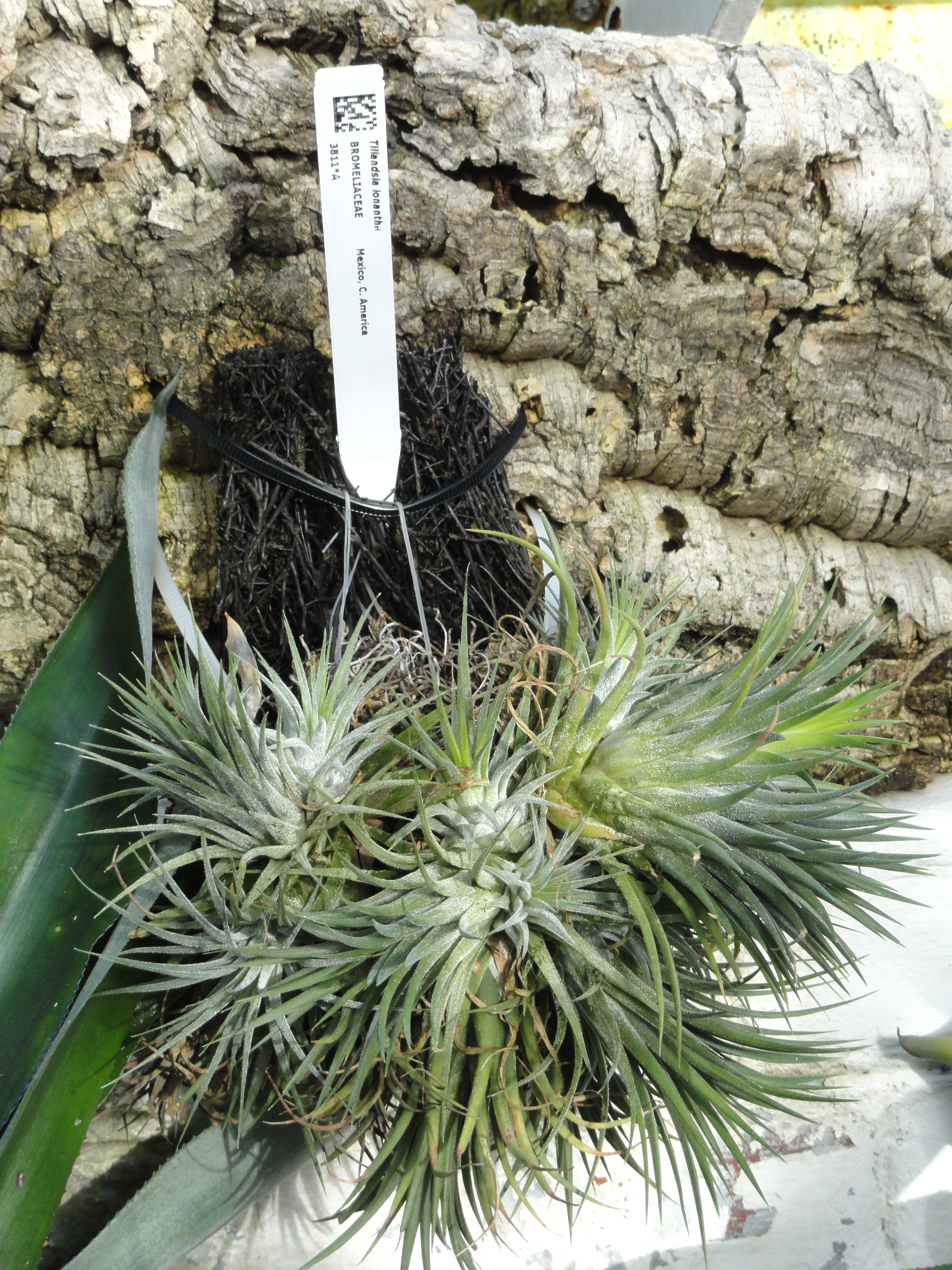
On a display

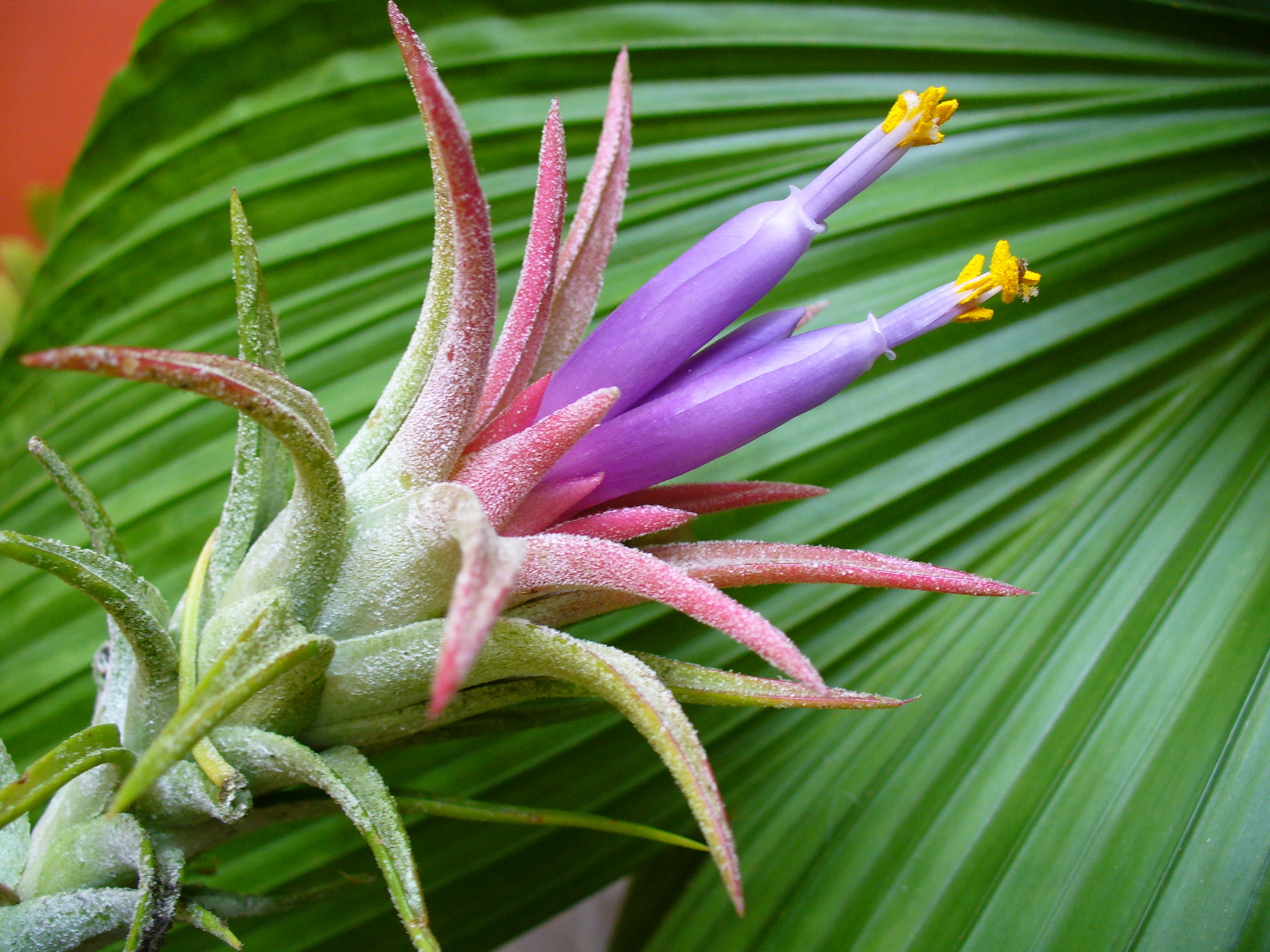
Inflorescence closeup

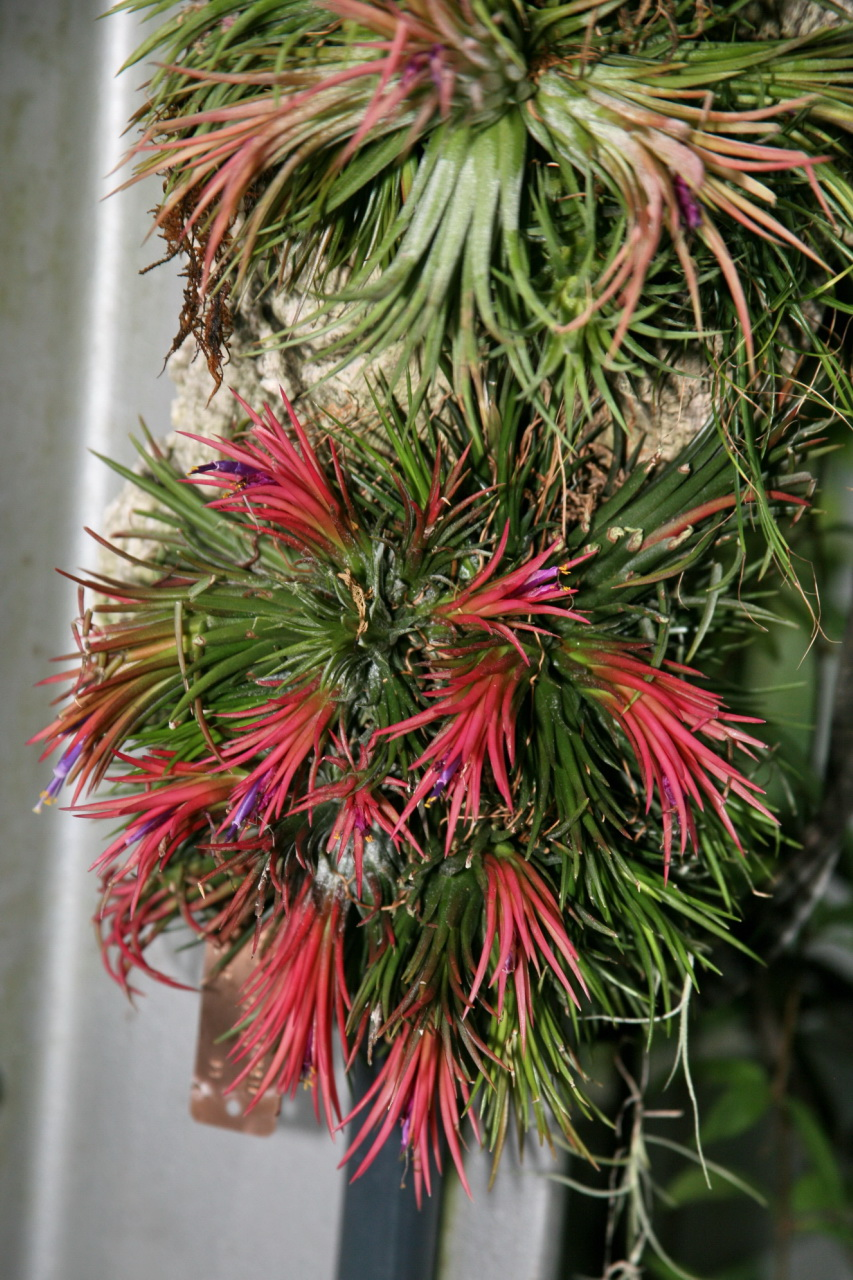
Flowering on a fence

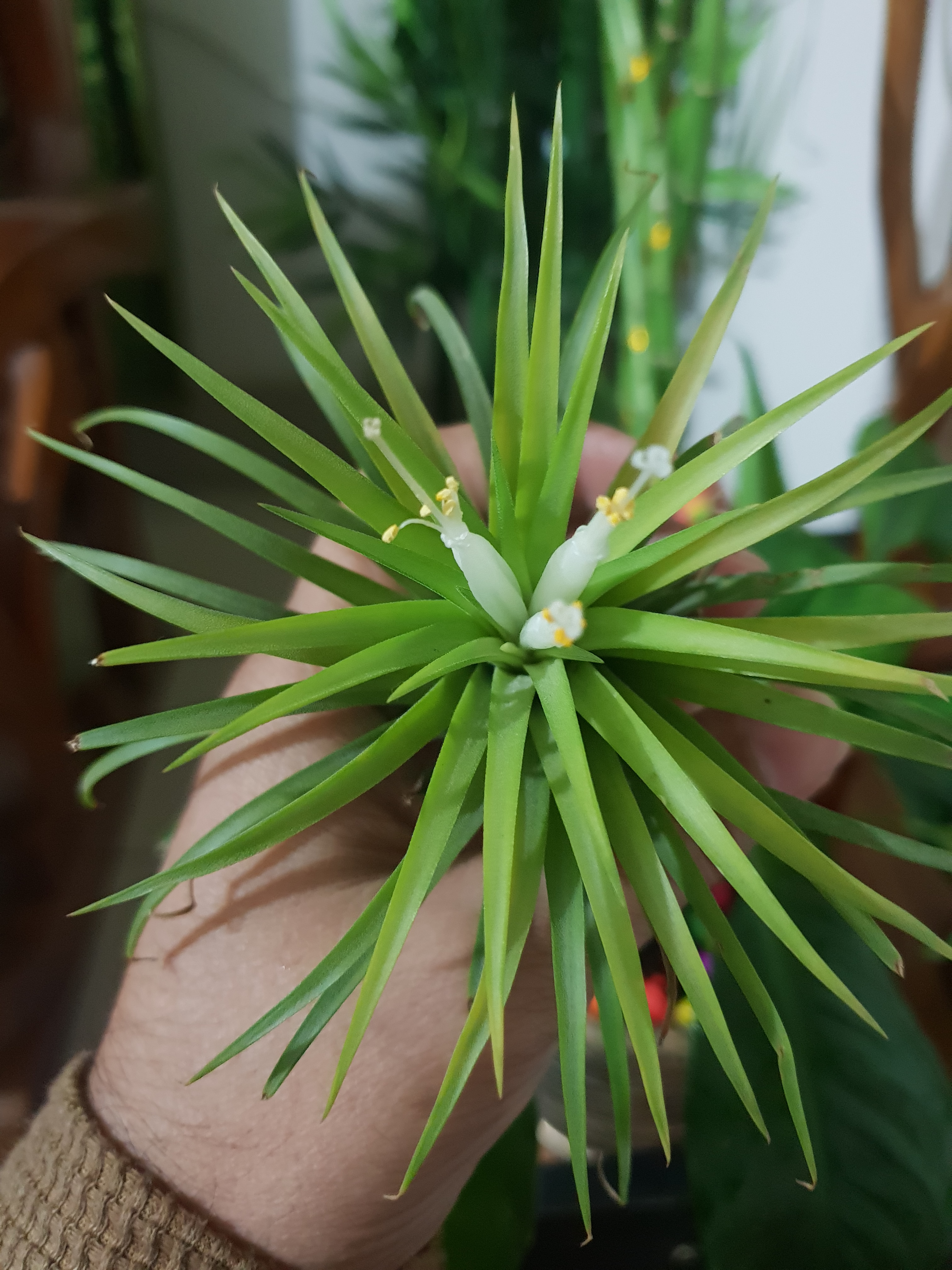
Cultivar Tillandsia 'Druid'

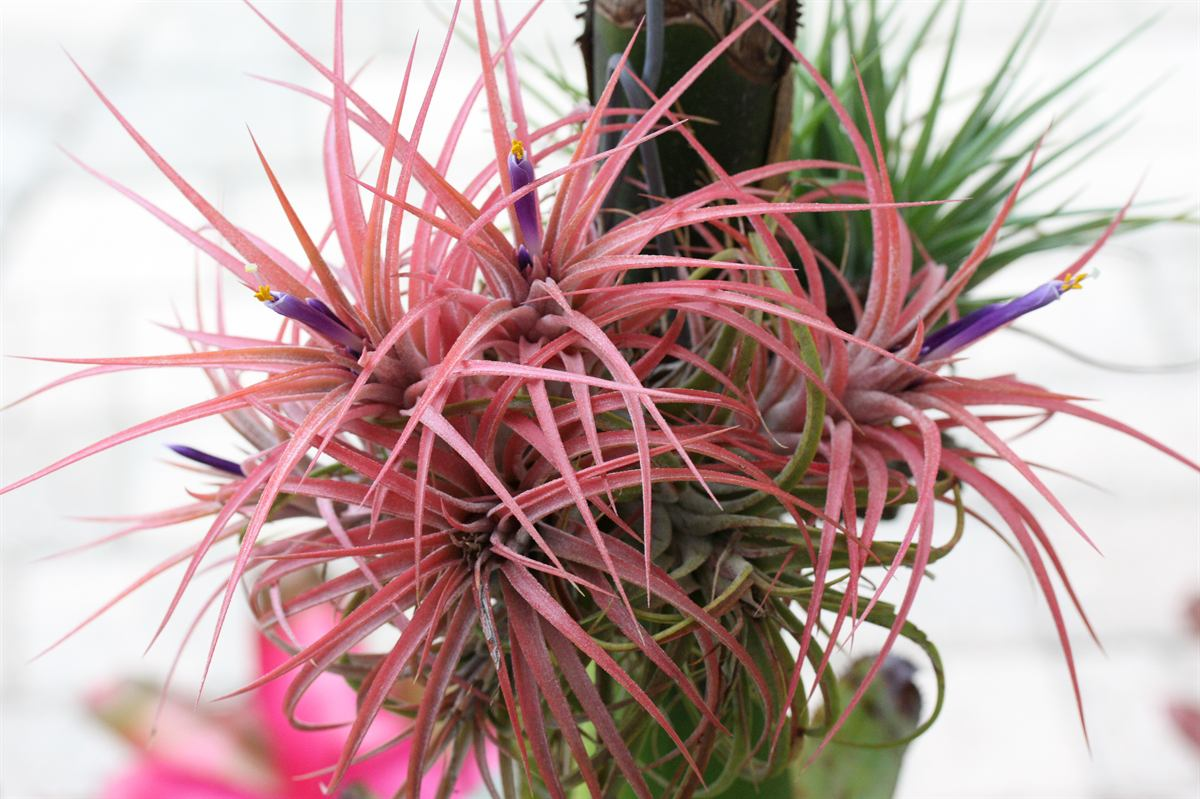
Cultivar Tillandsia 'Victoria'
