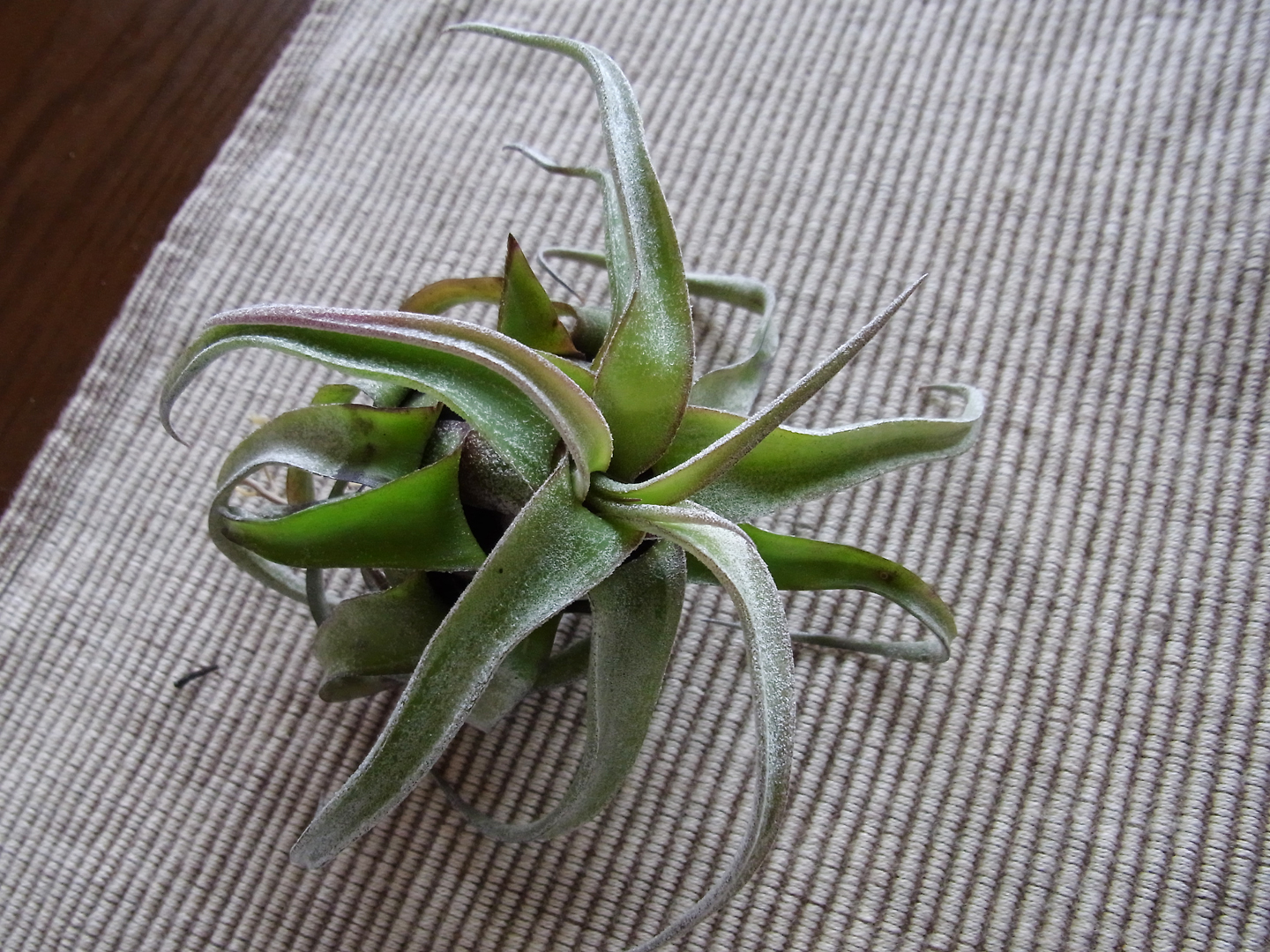

Scientific classification
- Kingdom: Plantae
- Clade: Tracheophytes
- Clade: Angiosperms
- Clade: Monocots
- Clade: Commelinids
- Order: Poales
- Family: Bromeliaceae
- Genus: Tillandsia
- Subgenus: Tillandsia subg. Tillandsia
- Species: T. streptophylla

Binomial name
- Tillandsia streptophylla Scheidw. ex E.Morren

= Tillandsia streptophylla =

Species of epiphyte

Tillandsia streptophylla is a species of flowering plant in the genus Tillandsia. This species is native to Central America, Mexico, and the West Indies (Bahamas, Cuba, Cayman Islands, Turks and Caicos Islands).

== Cultivars ==
- Tillandsia 'Anna'
- Tillandsia 'Asombroso'
- Tillandsia 'Como'
- Tillandsia 'Curly Slim'
- Tillandsia 'Diane Wilson'
- Tillandsia 'Eric Knobloch'
- Tillandsia 'Gorgon'
- Tillandsia 'Graceful'
- Tillandsia 'Gympie'
- Tillandsia 'Hines Poth'
- Tillandsia 'Jane Williams'
- Tillandsia 'Katie Styer' – T. capitata × T. streptophylla (Steve Correale)
- Tillandsia 'Kauri'
- Tillandsia 'Litl Liz'
- Tillandsia 'Love Knot'
- Tillandsia 'Lucille'
- Tillandsia 'Paterson'
- Tillandsia 'Redy'
- Tillandsia 'Selerepton'
- Tillandsia 'Showtime'
- Tillandsia 'Sitting Pretty'
- Tillandsia 'Tall Stranger'
- Tillandsia 'Toolara'
